This is a list of songs by their Roud Folk Song Index number; the full catalogue can also be found on the Vaughan Williams Memorial Library website.  Some publishers have added Roud numbers to books and liner notes, as has also been done with Child Ballad numbers and Laws numbers. This list (like the article List of the Child Ballads) also serves as a link to articles about the songs, which may use a very different song title. 

The songs are listed in the index by accession number, rather than (for example) by subject matter or in order of importance. Some well-known songs have low Roud numbers (for example, many of the Child Ballads), but others have high ones.

Some of the songs were also included in the collection Jacobite Reliques by Scottish poet and novelist James Hogg.

The Index

The index is a database of nearly 200,000 references to nearly 25,000 songs that have been collected from oral tradition in the English language from all over the world. It is compiled by Steve Roud, a former librarian in the London Borough of Croydon. The English Folk Dance and Song Society (EFDSS) listed 187,800 records in the growing Folksong database as at October 2012 (which total includes all of the songs in the Broadside database that have 'traditional' origins).

The purpose of the index is to give each song a unique identifying number. The numbers were assigned on a more or less arbitrary basis, and are not intended to carry any significance in themselves. However, because of the practicalities of compiling the index (building on previously published sources) it is true as a general rule that older and better-known songs tend to occupy low numbers, while songs which are obscure have higher numbers. Closely related songs are grouped under the same Roud number. If a trusted authority gives the name of a song but not the words it is assigned Roud number 000.

List

1 to 100
"The Raggle Taggle Gypsy" (Child 200)
"The Unfortunate Rake" (Laws Q26)
"The Sprig of Thyme", "The Seeds of Love", "Garners Gay"
"Lord Thomas and Fair Annet" (Child 73)
"The Three Ravens" (Child 26)
"Lamkin" (Child 93)
 "The Female Highwayman", "Sovay" (Laws N21)
"The Twa Sisters" (Child 10)
"The Cruel Mother" (Child 20)
"Lord Randal" (Child 12)
"The Baffled Knight" (Child 112)
"The Elfin Knight" (Child 2) (also "Scarborough Fair")
"The Dowie Dens o Yarrow" (Child 214)
"The Daemon Lover" (Child 243)
"The Cruel Ship's Carpenter" (Laws P36A/B)
"Frog Went A-Courting"
"The Three Butchers" (Laws L4)
"The Bramble Briar" (Laws M32)
"Honest Labourer"
"The Fause Knight Upon the Road" (Child 3)
"Lady Isabel and the Elf Knight" (Child 4)
"Gil Brenton" (Child 5)
"Earl Brand" (Child 7)
"Erlinton" (Child 8)
"The Fair Flower of Northumberland" (Child 9)
"The Cruel Brother" (Child 11)
 "Babylon", "The Bonnie Banks o Fordie" (Child 14)
"Hind Horn" (Child 17)
"Sir Lionel" (Child 18)
"Willie's Lyke-Wake" (Child 25)
 "A-Growing", "He's Young But He's Daily A-Growing" (Laws O35)
"Kempy Kay" (Child 33)
"Hind Etin" (Child 41)
"The Broomfield Hill" (Child 43)
"Tam Lin" (Child 39)
"Captain Wedderburn's Courtship" (Child 46)
"Proud Lady Margaret" (Child 47)
"The Twa Brothers" (Child 49)
"The King's Dochter Lady Jean" (Child 52)
"Young Beichan" (Child 53)
"Sir Patrick Spens" (Child 58)
"Fair Annie" (Child 62)
"Child Waters" (Child 63)
"Fair Janet" (Child 64)
 "Lady Maisry", "Bonnie Susie Cleland" (Child 65)
"Lord Ingram and Chiel Wyet" (Child 66)
"Young Hunting" (Child 68)
"Lord Lovel" (Child 75)
"The Lass of Roch Royal" (Child 76)
"Sweet William's Ghost" (Child 77)
"The Unquiet Grave" (Child 78)
"Little Musgrave and Lady Barnard" (Child 81)
"Child Maurice" (Child 83)
"Bonny Barbara Allan" (Child 84)
"Prince Robert" (Child 87)
"Young Johnstone" (Child 88)
"Fause Foodrage" (Child 89)
"Jellon Grame" (Child 90)
"Fair Mary of Wallington" (Child 91)
"Brisk Young Sailor (Courted Me)", "The Alehouse", "Died For Love", etc. (Laws P25)
"The Gay Goshawk" (Child 96)
"Brown Robyn" (Child 97)
"Johnie Scot" (Child 99)
"Willie o Winsbury" (Child 100)
"Willie o Douglas Dale" (Child 101)
"Tom Potts" (Child 109)
"The Knight and the Shepherd's Daughter" (Child 110)
"The Twelve Days of Christmas"
"Johnie Cock" (Child 114)
"A Gest of Robyn Hode" (Child 117)
"Robin Hood Rescuing Three Squires" (Child 140)
"Robin Hood and Queen Katherine" (Child 145)
"Sir Hugh" (Child 155)
"Queen Eleanor's Confession" (Child 156)
"Gude Wallace" (Child 157)
"Johnie Armstrong" (Child 169)
"The Death of Queen Jane" (Child 170)
"Six Dukes Went a-Fishing"
"Mary Hamilton" (Child 173)
 "Captain Car", "Edom o Gordon" (Child 178)
"The Laird o Logie" (Child 182)
"Jock o the Side" (Child 187)
"Archie o Cawfield" (Child 188)
"Hughie Grame" (Child 191)
 "The Lochmaben Harper", "The Blind Harper" (Child 192)
No record
"Jamie Douglas"; "Waly Waly", "The Water Is Wide", "When Cockleshells Turn Silver Bells" (Child 204)
"Lord Delaware" (Child 207)
"Lord Derwentwater" (Child 208)
"Geordie" (Child 209)
 "The Mother's Malison", "Clyde's Water" (Child 216)
"Broom of the Cowdenknowes" (Child 217)
"Katharine Jaffray" (Child 221)
"Lizie Lindsay" (Child 226)
"Glasgow Peggy" (Child 228)
"The Earl of Errol" (Child 231)
"Richie Story" (Child 232)
"Andrew Lammie" (Child 233)
"The Earl of Aboyne" (Child 235)
"Bonny Baby Livingston" (Child 222)

101 to 200
 101. "Glenlogie", "Bonnie Jean o' Bethelnie" (Child 238)
 102. "Lord Saltoun and Auchanachie" (Child 239)
 103. "The (Bonnie) Rantin' Laddie", "Lord Aboyne" (Child 240)
 104. "Henry Martin", "Sir Andrew Barton" (Child 167 / Child 250) (see also Roud 192)
 105. "The Kitchie-Boy", "Bonny Foot-Boy", "Earl Richard's Daughter" (Child 252)
 106. "Lord William", "Lord Lundy", "Sweet William" (Child 254)
 107. "Burd Isabel And (Earl/Sir) Patrick", "Burd Bell" (Child 257)
 108. "Broughty Wa's", "(Burd) Helen" (Child 258)
 109. "(Lord Thomas and) Lady Margaret", "Clerk Tamas (and Fair Annie)" (Child 260)
 110. "John Thomson and the Turk", "The Trooper and the Turk" (Child 266)
 111. "The Heir of Linne" (Child 267)
 112. "Lady Diamond (and the King's Daughter)", "Lady Daisy", "Eliza's Bower" (Child 269)
 113. "The Lord of Lorn (and the Flas Steward)" (Child 271)
 114. "Four Nights Drunk" (Child 274)
 115. "Get Up and Bar the Door", "John Blunt", "Old John Jones" (Child 275)
 116. "The Friar (in the Well/and the Maid/Well Fitted)" (Child 276)
 117. "The Wife Wrapt in Wether's Skin", "The (Wee) Cooper of Fife", "The Daughter of Peggy-O", "Dan Doo", etc. (Child 277)
 118. "The (Jolly/Ragged/Dirty) Beggar", "Davy Faa", "Farmer and Tinker", "Gaberlunyie Man", etc. (Child 279)
 119. "The Beggar-Laddie", "The Beggar's (Dawtie/Prince)", etc. (Child 280)
 120. "The Keach i the Creel" (Child 281)
 121. "The Highwayman Outwitted By a Farmer's Daughter"
 122. "Sweet Trinity", "Golden Vanity", "Bold Trellitee", etc. (Child 286)
 123. "(The) (Young) (Earl of) Essex('s Victory over the Emperor of Germany)", "Queen Elizabeth's Champion", "Great Britain's Glory" (Child 288)
 124. "The Mermaid", "As I Sailed Out One Friday Night", "The Cabin Boy" (Child 289)
 125. "The Wylie Wife of the Hie Toun Hie", "The Flowers of Edinburgh", "My Lady Ye Shall Be" (Child 290)
 126. "The Derby Ram", "As I was Going to Derby"
 127. "The Leaves of Life", "Under the Leaves", "The Seven Virgins"
 128. "The Herring Song", "Bolliton Sands", "The (Jolly) (Old/Red) Herring('s Head)"
 129. "The Rattlin' Bog", "The Everlasting Circle", "Down in the Lowlands"
 130. "Three Jolly Rogues"
 131. "The Fox"
 132. "The Blind Beggar" (Laws N27)
 133. "Green Grow The Rushes Oh", "Come and I Will Sing You", "The Dilly Song", etc.
 134. "The Coasts of High Barbaree" (Laws K33)
 135. "O Let Me in This Ae Night", "Cold Blow And A Rainy Night", "The Laird o' Windywa's", etc.
 136. "King Orfeo" (Child 19)
 137. "Widecombe Fair", "Tom Pearce", "Tam Pierce"
 138. "The Miller's Three Sons", "The Miller's Will", "The Miller and His Sons", "The Dishonest Miller" (Laws Q21)
 139. "Jones' Ale", "Joan's Ale Was New"
 140. "The Bold Grenadier", "The Nightingale Song", "One Morning In May", etc. (Laws P14)
 141. "Dog And Gun", "The Golden Glove" (Laws N20)
 142. "Charming Mary Neal" (Laws M17)
 143. "The Counting Song", "One Man Went to Mow", etc.
 144. "The Maid Freed from the Gallows" (Child 95), "The Prickle Holly Bush"
 145. "Glasgerion", "Glenkindie" (Child 67)
 146. "No, Sir, No", "No John No"
 147. "Clerk Corvill", "(Giles/George) Collins", "Lady Alice" (Child 42 / Child 85)
 148. "The Banks of Sweet Dundee" (Laws M25)
 149. "The Crabfish"
 150. "When I Was a Young Man I Lived Rarely"
 151. "An Awhesyth", "The Pretty Ploughboy", or other versions of "The Lark in the Morning"; "The Lark in the Morning" is a version on its own
 152. "Early Early In The Spring", "The Trail To Mexico", "The Sailor Deceived", etc. (Laws M1)
 153. "The Haymakers' Song", "The (Pleasant) Month of May"
 154. "I Once Loved a Lass", "The False Bride", "The Week Before Easter"
 155. "Mary Of The (Wild) Moor" (Laws P24)
 156. "The Betrayed Maiden", "Betsy (The Waiting Maid)", etc. (Laws M20)
 157. "Banks of the Ohio" (Laws F5)
 158. "Bold William Taylor" (Laws N11)
 159. "The Soldier's Alphabet"
 160. "The Farmer's Curst Wife" (Child 278)
 161. "Riddles Wisely Expounded", "Lay Bent To The Bonny Broom", "The Devil's Nine Questions", etc. (Child 1)
 162. "The Light Dragoon", "The Trooper And The Maid", etc. (Child 299)
 163. "The Jolly Ploughboy", "The Scarlet And The Blue", "The Warwickshire RHA", etc.
 164. "John Barleycorn"
 165. "Adieu My Lovely Nancy", "The Sailor's Farewell", "Swansea Town", etc.
 166. "Polly Vaughn" (Laws O36)
 167. "The Brisk Young Butcher", "The Leicester Chambermaid", "Aikey Fair", etc.
 168. "The Fair Lass Of Islington"
 169. "The Seasons Of The Year"
 170. "Once I Had A Sweetheart"
 171. "Young Ramble Away", "Brimbledown Fair"
 172. "Bonnie Annie", "The Banks Of Green Willow" (Child 24)
 173. "Strawberry Fair"
 174. "The Cobbler And The Butcher", "The Cunning Cobbler Done Over"
 175. "Cruel Was My Father", etc. (Laws P20)
 176. "The Little Dun Mare"
 177. No record
 178. "The Gentleman Soldier", "The Sentry", etc.
 179. "The Grey Cock", "Saw You My Father?", "The Cock Is Crowing", etc. (Child 248)
 180. "The Brown Girl" (Child 295)
 181. "The Maid on The Shore", "The Mermaid", "The Sea Captain" (Laws K27)
 182. "Edwin", "Young Edwin in the Lowlands Low"
 183. "Eggs and Marrowbone", "Marrowbones" (Laws Q2)
 184. "Johnny Sands" (Laws Q3)
 185. "The Drowned (Lover/Sailor)", "In London Fair City", "Scarborough Banks", etc. (Laws K18)
 186. "The (Pretty/Jolly/Simple) Ploughboy" (Laws M24)
 187. "Jemmy And Nancy", "The Yarmouth Tragedy", etc. (Laws M38)
 188. "The Councillor's Daughter", "The Crafty Lover", "The Lawyer Outwitted", etc. (Laws N26)
 189. "The Lake Of Coulfin", "Willy Leonard", etc. (Laws Q33)
 190. "Bold Reynard", "Bold Reynolds", "Gentlemen of High Renown"
 191. "The White/Blue/Green Cockade", "Sad Recruit", etc.
 192. "Elder Bordee", "A True Relation of the Death of Sir Andrew Barton a Pyrate and Rover" (Child 167 / Child 250) (see also Roud 104)
 193. "Sweet Lemminy"
 194. No record
 195. "Sir Arthur And Sweet Mollee", etc. (Laws O14)
 196. "The Wife of Usher's Well", "The Lady Gay", "Three Little Babes", etc. (Child 79)
 197. "The Great Silkie of Sule Skerry" (Child 113)
 198. "Willie and Lady Maisry" (Child 70)
 199. "The Famous Flower of Serving-Men" (Child 106)
 200. "Edward", "How Come That Blood on Your Shirt Sleeve", etc. (Child 13)

201 to 300 
 201. "The False Lover Won Back" (Child 218)
 202. "The Jolly Ploughboy", "Two Young Brethren", "The Two Brothers"
 203. "O Good Ale Thou Art My Darling"
 204. "Maa Bonny Lad"
 205. "The Bonny Hind" (Child 50)
 206. "Rare Willie Drowned in Yarrow" (Child 215)
 207. "Santianna", "Santy Anna", "The Plains of Mexico"
 208. "Poor Paddy Works on the Railway"
 209. "Here We Come A-wassailing", "Gloucestershire Wassail", "Gower Wassail", and other wassails
 210. "Maids When You're Young Never Wed an Old Man"
 211. "Wa'ney Island Cockfight", "The Bonny Grey"
 212. "Gaberlunzie Man"
 213. No record
 214. "Famed Waterloo" (Laws 38)
 215. "Maria Martin"
 216. "Stormalong"
 217. "When Bucks A-Hunting Go"
 218. "Oxford/Worcester City"
 219. "Thomas the Rhymer" (Child 37)
 220. "Willie's Lady" (Child 6)
 221. "Van Diemen's Land", "Young Henry the Poacher"
 222. "Thorny Moor Woods"
 223. "The Ballad of Chevy Chase", "The Hunting of Cheviot" (Child 162)
 224. "Captain Ward and the Rainbow" (Child 287)
 225. No record
 226. "The Female Drummer"
 227. "Admiral Benbow"
 228. "The Widow of Westmoreland's Daughter"
 229. "Little Gypsy Girl" (Laws O4)
 230. "We Wish You a Merry Christmas", "Open the Door", etc.
 231. "The Cabin Boy", "I am a Maid that's Deep in Love" (Laws 231)
 232. "The Game Of Cards", "Game of All Fours"
 233. "The Duke of Marlborough"
 234. "Lizie Wan" (Child 51)
 235. "A You a Hinny Bird"
 236. "The Cutty Wren"
 237. "Bessy Bell and Mary Gray" (Child 201)
 238. "The Happy Couple" (Laws N15)
 239. "Female Cabin Boy" (Laws N13), "Handsome Cabin Boy" (Laws M23)
 240. "The Best Old Man", "My Good Old Man", "My Old Man"
 241. "The German Clockmaker", "I am a Von German"
 242. "Young Allan" (Child 245)
 243. "Redesdale and Wise William" (Child 246)
 244. "Willie's Fatal Visit" (Child 255)
 245. "Alison and Willie" (Child 256)
 246. "The Suffolk Miracle", "The Holland Handkerchief"(Child 272)
 247. "The Laird o Drum" (Child 236)
 248. "King Edward the Fourth and a Tanner of Tamworth" (Child 273)
 249. "John Dory" (Child 284)
 250. "John of Hazelgreen" (Child 293)
 251. "King Henry Fifth's Conquest of France" (Child 164)
 252. "Three Drunken Maidens"
 253. "Fair Margaret and Sweet William" (Child 74)
 254. "Frankie and Johnny", "Frankie Dean"
 255. "Engine One-Forty-Three", "The FFV", "George Alley", etc. (Laws G3)
 256. "The Jam at Gerry's Rock" (Laws C1)
 257. "The State of Arkansas"
 258. "The Soldiers's Poor Little Boy" (Laws Q28)
 259. "Jack o' Diamonds"
 260. "Fair Charlotte" (Laws G17)
 261. "The Boston Burglar" (Laws L16)
 262. "The Girl I Left Behind" (Laws P1)
 263. "The Cruel Miller" (Laws P35)
 264. "John Riley", "The Broken Token", "A Fair Young Maid All in Her Garden" (Laws N42)
 265. "The Dark Eyed Sailor" (Laws N35)
 266. "Banks of Claudy", "Claudy Banks", "Cloddy Banks" (Laws N40)
 267. "George Riley", "John Riley", "Young Riley" (Laws N36 / Laws N37)
 268. "Jack Monroe"
 269. "Rosemary Lane", "Bell Bottom Trousers"
 270. "John Riley" (Laws M8)
 271. "Villikens and Dinah" (Laws M31)
 272. "The Rebel Soldier"
 273. "A Sailor's Life" (Laws K12)
 274. "The Sailor's Bride" (Laws K10)
 275. "The Little Mohee", "The Lass of Mohee" (Laws H8)
 276. "The Green Bed" (Laws K36)
 277. "Seventeen Come Sunday" (Laws O17)
 278. "The Seven Joys of Mary"
 279. "Green Grows the Laurel"
 280. "Erin's Green Shore" (Laws Q27)
 281. "Father Grumble", "The Old Man Who Lived in the Woods" (Laws Q1)
 282. "Grandma's Advice"
 283. "Three Jolly Huntsmen", "Six Jovial Welshmen"
 284. "Shepherds Are the Best of Men"
 285. "Old Polina"
 286. "The Beggars Chorus", "To the Begging I Will Go"
 287. "Old Christmas Day"
 288. "Babes in the Wood" (Laws Q34)
 289. "The Box Upon Her Head" (Laws L3)
 290. "Three Maidens A-Milking Did Go"
 291. "The Bold Fisherman" (Laws O24)
 292. "Lass O' Glenshea" (Laws O6)
 293. "My Bonny Boy", "The Grey Hawk"
 294. "Brian O Linn"
 295. No record
 296. "The Spanish Fight"
 297. "Cupid's Garden"
 298. "Dabbling in the Dew"
 299. "The Lincolnshire Poacher"
 300. "Adieu to Your Judges and Juries"

301 to 400 
 301. "Loss of the Amphitrite", "The Anford-wright"
 302. "King John and the Bishop" (Child 45)
 303. "The Twa Knights" (Child 268)
 304. "Souling Song", "Catherning", "Stafford Begging Song", "Caking Song"
 305. "May Song", "May-day Carol", "Awake Awake", "Padstow May Song", "Whitsuntide Carol"
 306. "The Carnal and the Crane", "King Herod and the Cock", "King Pharim" (Child 55)
 307. "The Little Lowland Maid", "The Cruel Lowland Maid", "The Pretty Sailor"
 308. "Irish Girl", "New Irish Girl", "Molly Bawn", "As I Walked Out", "Red Red Rose", "Banagher Town", "The Irish Wash-woman", "Grace Grace", "Gramachree", "My Irish Polly", "I Wish I Were", "One May Morning", "Love It is a Killing Thing", "Irish Girl's Lament", "I Would I Were a Little Bird", "Pretty Polly", "Let the Wind Blow High or Low", "One Day as I Walked", "I Wish I Was in Dublin Town", "Red and Rosie Wis Her Cheeks", "I Wish I Had You in Yon Green Lawn", "The Manchester Angel", "Down By Yon Riverside", "Her Boots Were O the Spanish Leather"
 309. "Canada-I-O"
 310. "Harvest Home", "Here's a Health unto Our Master", "The Mistress's Health", "Shepherd's Health", "The Greasy Cook", "Sheep Shearing Toast", "Drink Boys Drink", "Peas Beans Oats and the Barley", "Bridal Song", "The Haymakers' Song"
 311. "The Bold Trooper", "The Old Drover", "The Game Cock"
 312. "Blackwater Side" (Laws O1)
 313. "The Mountaineer's Courtship", "When Shall We Be Married", "Nicol O' Cod", "Nicholas Wood", "Haymaker's Song", "The Country Courtship", "What'll I Wear to the Wedding John", "Buffalo Boy", "My Dear Old Innocent Boy", "Reckle Mahudie", "My Old Sweet Nichol", "Joan to Jan", "Dear Old Ages Boy", "Nickety Nod", "John and Mary", "Where Shall We Go For Our Honeymoon John", "Johnny My Darling Lad"
 314. "The Sailor Likes His Bottle O", "The Sailor's Loves", "So Early in the Morning", "A Bottle of Rum"
 315. "Five Gallon Jar"
 316. No record
 317. "Rio Grande"
 318. "A Long Time Ago", "Noah's Ark Shanty"
 319. "Sacramento"
 320. "Sing Fare You Well"
 321. "The Bold Dragoon" (Laws M27)
 322. "Drunken Sailor"
 323. "The Battle of Chevy Chase"
 324. "Oh Shenandoah"
 325. "South Australia"
 326. "Billy Boy", "Billy My Billy", "Charming Billy", "My Boy Willie", "My Boy Tammy", "Tammy's Courtship", "I Am to Court a Wife", "The Lammie", "Where Have You Been All the Day", "We're All Jolly Fellows That Follow the Plough", "Lord Rendal", "Bonny Lad Highland Lad", "Willy the Witch", "Can't Jump Josie"
 327. "The Bully Boat", "Sally My Dear", "Ranzo", "Oh What Did You Give for Your Fine Leg O' Mutton"
 328. "Zip Coon", "Wild Goose Nation", "Ranso", "Huckleberry Hunting", "The Wild Goose Shanty"
 329. "Hares on the Mountain", "Sally my Dear", "Knife in the Window", "Crawling and Creeping"
 330. "The Riddle Song", "I Gave My Love a Cherry", "Perry Merry Dictum Domine", "Kilkenny Is a Fine Place", "Don't You Go A-rushing", "Four Sisters", "Four Brothers", "My Father Gave Me Fifty Cents", "Gifts From Over the Sea", "I'm a Rover", "Dublin Bay"
 331. "Sally in the Garden Sifting Sand", "Sally Ann", "The Hog-eyed Man", "Rodybodysho", "Hauling into Blackwall Docks", "O Who's Been Here", "As I Went up in My Cornfield"
 332. "Robin Hood and the Tanner" (Child 126)
 333. "The Bold Pedlar and Robin Hood" (Child 132)
 334. "The Bonny Earl of Murray" (Child 181)
 335. "The Death of Parcy Reed" (Child 193)
 336. "The Fire of Frendraught" (Child 196)
 337. "Bothwell Bridge" (Child 206)
 338. "Bonnie James Campbell" (Child 210)
 339. "The Gardener" (Child 219)
 340. "Rob Roy" (Child 225)
 341. "Bonny Lizie Baillie" (Child 227)
 342. "The Duke of Gordon's Daughter" (Child 237)
 343. "The Baron o Leys" (Child 241)
 344. "Astrilly", "The Pitman's Farewell"
 345. "Jeannie and Jamie", "Huntingtower" (Laws O23)
 346. "All Jolly Fellows that Follow the Plough", "Jolly Plough Boys", "Arise My Jolly Fellows", "'Twas Early One Morning", "One Midsummer's Morning", "The Cocks Were A-crowing", etc.
 347. "Greenland Whale Fishery"
 348. "William and Mary", "Little Mary, The Sailor's Bride", etc. (Laws N28)
 349. "Isle Of St. Helena", "Boney's In St. Helena", "Boney's Defeat"
 350. "The Soldier and the Sailor", "The Soldier's Prayer"
 351. "The River Lea"
 352. No record
 353. "Johnnie Booker", "Do My Johnny Poco"
 354. "Leave Her Johnnie Leave Her"
 355. "The Painful Plough", "The Useful Plough", "The Faithful Plough", "Old Friend Gardener and Ploughman"
 356. "The Sweet Nightingale"
 357. "Old Humphrey Hodge", "Rock the Cradle John"
 358. "Bold Reynard the Fox", "The Duke's Hunt"
 359. "Ellen the Fair"
 360. "The Roving Journeyman", "The Roving Irishman", "The Roving Navvie Man", "Roving Jack"
 361. "The Courting Case", "The Drunkard's Courtship"
 362. "The Old Man From Over The Sea"
 363. "Hares in the Old Plantation", "The Hearty Poacher", "I Keep My Dogs and Ferrets, Too"
 364. "Jack the Rover", "Aylesbury Girl", "Haselbury Girl", "As I Went Down to Salisbury", "As I Rode Up Through London Street", "Untied Garter"
 365. "Arthur of Bradley's Wedding"
 366. "Seeking Service", "The Rigwiddy Carlin", "Bargain with Me", "Tam Bo/Bowie/Booey", "Magherafelt Hiring Fair", "My Brave Billy Boy", "The Wanton Widow"
 367. "Sweet Polly Oliver"
 368. "Blow the Candle Out", "Bengalee Baboo"
 369. "Sam Hall" (Laws L5)
 370. "At the Dawning of the Day"
 371. "Sweet Nightingale", "Come Come My Pretty Maid", "Well Met Pretty Maid", "To Milk in the Valley Below", "The Milkpail"
 372. "British Man-of-war", "Lovely/Pretty Susan"
 373. "The Braemar Poacher", "The Roving Highlander", "The Poacher of Benabourd"
 374. "The Wark O' the Weavers" (David Shaw)
 375. "O'er the Muir Among the Heather", "Up Yon Wide and Lonely Glen", "Heather Down the Moor"
 376. "Outward Bound", "The Faithful Sailor Boy" (Laws K13)
 377. "Basket of Eggs", "Eggs in Her Basket"
 378. "Bonny Blue Handkerchief"
 379. "Green Broom", "The Broom Dasher", "Jack and His Brooms"
 380. "Seven/Two Years O'er Young", "Touch Not the Nettle"
 381. "The Scornful Dame", "Come Write Me Down Ye Powers Above", "Second Thoughts Best", "The Shepherd and His Bride"
 382. "Richard/Dicky of Taunton Dean", "Old Dobbin", "Dumbledown Deary"
 383. "The Broken-down Gentleman"
 384. "Farewell to Nova Scotia"
 385. "Batchelor's Hall", "Bachelor's Hall", "When Boys Go A-courting"
 386. "Rambling Boys/Lads of Pleasure"
 387. "The Blackbird", "If I Was a Blackbird"
 388. "The Wreck off Scilly", "The Rocks of Scilly", "Stormy Winds Do Blow"
 389. "Hark!  Hark!  What News?"
 390. "Old Dan Tucker"
 391. "Jeannette and Jeannot", "Poor Jeannette"
 392. No record
 393. "The Hearty Good Fellow", "One Penny", "No Money and Plenty", "Saddle My Horse"
 394. "God Rest You Merry Gentlemen", "Come All You Worthy Gentlemen"
 395. "Cheerly Man", "Sally Racket"
 396. "The Bold Lieutenant", "The London Lady", "The Lion's Den", "Lions and Tigers", "St. James's", "The Lady of Carlisle" (Laws O25)
 397. "Reynardine"
 398. "Caroline of Edinburgh Town", "The Hedginer" (Laws P27)
 399. "The Sheffield/Unfortunate Apprentice", "Died for Love of You", "The Chambermaid", "The Maid and Her Box", "My Sad Overthrow"
 400. "William Hall", "George Reilly", "The Brisk Young Lover/Farmer"

401 to 500 
 401. "No, My Love No", "Warfare Is Raging", "Bad Company Did Entice Me"
 402. "I Drew My Ship into a Harbour", "Awake Awake You Drowsy Sleeper", "Who Is Tapping at my Window?", "I'll Lock You Up in Your Bedchamber", "Cruel Father", "Daughter In The Dungeon"
 403. "The Drowsy Sleeper"
 404. "The State of Georgia", "Born and Raised in Ole Virginia", "O Molly Dear, Go Ask Your Mother"
 405. "Lover's Lament","Beauty Bright", "Oh Once I Did Court a Damsel", "Don't You Remember Last Friday Night", "Off to the War", "The Single Girl"
 406. "Locks and Bolts", "'Twas over Hills", "Young Men and Maids", "I Never Knew", "The Back o' Benachie", "Johnny Dials", "Over Hills and over Fields", "Anna May", "The Cuckoo"
 407. "Pretty Nancy of Yarmouth", "Barbara Allen"
 408. "The Farmer's Boy"
 409. "Butcher Boy"
 410. "Bury Me Beneath the Willow"
 411. "Dear Companion"
 412. "The Rejected Lover"
 413. "The Cuckoo"
 414. "On Top of Old Smoky"
 415. "The Blind Girl", "The Blind Child's Prayer"
 416. No record
 417. "Pretty Saro", "Go Away Willie", "Sir Hugh"
 418. "Mary at the Garden Gate"
 419. "The False Young Man", "False True Love", "Bird in a Cage", "T Stands for Thomas", "False Lover's Farewell", "As I Walked Out One May Morning", "The Verdant Braes of Screen"
 420. "The Silk Merchant's Daughter", "Miss Martha", "The Virginian Lover"
 421. "Sinful to Flirt"
 422. "Turtle Dove", "True Lover's Farewell", "Careless Love", "Fare Thee Well"
 423. No record
 424. "My Love Is Over the Sea", "Sailing on the Sea", "Sea Song"
 425. "The Bind Girl's Prayer" 
 426. "Rosewood Casket"
 427. "Tarry Trousers"
 428. "The Gambling Man"
 429. No record
 430. "Pretty Polly Perkins of Paddington Green"
 431. "Rattlesnake Mountain"
 432. "Will the Weaver" (Laws Q9)
 433. "A Week's Work Well Done", "Tiresome Wife", "The Holly Twig", "Bachelor Bright and Brave"
 434. "The Dumb Wife's Tongue Let Loose"
 435. "The Weary Pund O'Tow"
 436. "Single Girl", "O Then", "The Deserter"
 437. "O Then O Then", "I Wish I Was Single Again"
 438. "The Lazy Farmer", "The Lazy Man", "Georgia Boy", "Harm Link"
 439. "Spring Glee","When Spring Comes In", "The Dairymaid"
 440. "Cornbread and Buttermilk", "Old Virginia Girls"
 441. "I Must and I Will Get Married", "The Fit's Come On Me Now"
 442. "Hardly Think I Will", "Common Bill", "Silly Billy", "The Green Young Man"
 443. "Scenes Of Winter"
 444. "Charles Guiteau" (Laws E11)
 445. No record
 446. "Down in the Willow Garden", "Rose Connelly" (Laws F6)
 447. "Omie Wise"
 448. "Ellen Smith" (Laws F11)
 449. "Macafee's Confession", "Harry Gray"
 450. "When the Work's All Done This Fall"
 451. "Come All You Fair and Tender Ladies"
 452. "The Bitter Withy"
 453. "The Cherry-Tree Carol" (Child 54)
 454. "The Irish Girl", "Meeting Is a Pleasure", "Loving Hanner", "You Will Remember"
 455. "Johnny Doyle/Dials", "The Muddy Droves"
 456. "Skewball", "The Plains of Kildare"
 457. "The Orphan Girl"
 458. "Two Little Orphans"
 459. "Fond Affection", "Go and Leave Me, If You Wish It", "Once I Loved"
 460. "I'm Thinking Tonight of My Blue Eyes", "Broken Vows", "Broken Hearted Lovers"
 461. "Fair and Tender Maidens"
 462. No record
 463. "They Were Standing By the Window"
 464. "Look on and Cry"
 465. "The Rowan County Murder"
 466. "The Drowned Lover", "Down by the Sea-Shore", "Oh! My Love's Dead", "I Never Will Marry" (Laws K17)
 467. "The Deaf Woman's Courtship"
 468. "Billy Grimes"
 469. "The Foolish Boy", "The Swapping Song", "The Bugle Played for Me", "Six Horses", etc.
 470. "The Mocking Bird"
 471. "Black Mustache"
 472. "Blow the Wind Wester/Whistling"
 473. "Well Done Liar", "Martin Said To His Man"
 474. "I Have Finished Him a Letter", "Anna Lee"
 475. "All For Me Grog"
 476. "Brennan on the Moor"
 477. "Dives and Lazarus" (Child 56)
 478. "The New York Trader", "Sir William Gower", "Bedlam", etc.
 479. "Sir Cawline" (Child 61)
 480. "Come All You Western Rangers"
 481. "Tom's Gone to Ilo"
 482. "Brown Adam" (Child 98)
 483. "The Bailiff's Daughter of Islington" (Child 105)
 484. "Lowlands of Holland", "Come All You Little Irish Girls", "The Lawlands O' Holland", "(The) Low (Low) Lands of Holland", "The Lowlands O' Holland", "Lowlands Low", "The Maid's Lamentation For the Loss of Her True Love", "The Lowlands of Germany", "The Soldier Bride's Lament", "Maiden's Complaint For the Loss of Her Sailor", "The Lily of Arkansas", "Sea Captain, (the/a) New Song", "I'll Build Myself a Gallant Ship", "Abroad as I Was Walking", "Holland is a Fine Place", "A New Song, Called the Distressed Sailor", "The Cold Fields of Ireland",
 485. "Boney Was a Warrior"
 486. "New York Girls", "Can't You Dance the Polka"
 487. "Lady Franklin's Lament", "Lord Franklin" (Laws K9)
 488. "Whip Jamboree"
 489. "Soldier Will You Marry Me"
 490. "The Newry Highwayman", "Adieu, Adieu", "The Rambling Boy" (Laws L120)
 491. "The Poor Old Couple"
 492. "The Rainbow", "The Fight of the Spanish Main", "The Rich Damsel", "As We Were A-Sailing", etc. (Laws N4)
 493. "The Deserter"
 494. "Cock Robin"
 495. "Died for Love", "Oh What a Voice", "I Wish I Wish", "I Wish I Was a Child Again", "Sweet William"
 496. "Glee", "Of All The Birds", "Jolly Red Nose", "The Owl"
 497. "Christmas Day in the Morning"
 498. "The Roving Gambler"
 499. "Man of Constant Sorrow"
 500. "Pearl Bryant", "Jealous Lover", "The Berkshire Tragedy", "Philadelphia lawyer" (Laws F1A / Laws F1B / Laws F1C)

501 to 600 
 501. "Skin and Bones"
 502. "London Bridge Is Falling Down"
 503. "Miller of Dee"
 504. No record
 505. "Wicked Polly"
 506. "Whistle O'er the Lave O't", "The Kneeband", "My Mother Sent Me for Some Water"
 507. No record
 508. No record
 509. "The Nut Girl", "A-Nutting We Will Go"
 510. "Butter and Cheese and All"
 511. "Jack the Jolly Tar", "Pull the String", "Do Me Ama"
 512. "Colin and Phoebe"
 513. "Poor Old Horse"
 514. "The Holly and the Ivy", "Sans Day Carol"
 515. "The Massacre at Glencoe", "The Pride of Glencoe", "MacDonald", "Donald's Return to Glencoe"
 516. "With my Navvy Boots On", "Bold English Navvy"
 517. "Airlin's Fine Braes", "Cairse of Brindese/Pomaise"
 518. "The Rambling Sailor"
 519. "Van Diemen's Land", "The Poacher's/Smuggler's Song"
 520. "The Kerry Recruit" (Laws J8)
 521. "Donald Munro", "Two Sons of North Britain"
 522. "The Death of Nelson"
 523. "The Loss of the Ramillies", "The Wreck of the Ramillies"
 524. "Ye Gentlemen of England"
 525. "Down on Erin's Wild Shore", "The Desolate Widow", "Isle of Man Shore", "Quays of Belfast"
 526. "Charles Dickson", "Sally Monroe"
 527. "Farewell, Dearest Nancy"
 528. "The Bold Princess Royal" (Laws K29)
 529. "Kelly the Pirate"
 530. "The Tarry Sailor"
 531. "The Saucy Sailor Boy" (Laws K38)
 532. No record
 533. "Whiskey in the Jar"
 534. "Patrick Fleming", "Lovell the Robber"
 535. No record
 536. "William and Harriet"
 537. "Willie Reilly (And (His) (Dear) Colleen Bawn)"
 538. "The Trial of Willy Reilly"
 539. "Her Servant Man"
 540. "The Squire's Young Daughter"
 541. "The Braes o' Balquither" (inspiration for "Wild Mountain Thyme"/"Will You Go Lassie, Go")
 542. "Yonder Stands a Lovely Creature", "The Roving Sailor", "Ripest Apples", "Spanish Lady"
 543. No record
 544. "Farmyard Song", "I Love My Little Rooster", "The Thrashing Machine"
 545. "The Bonnie Lass o' Fyvie", "Peggy-O"
 546. "Georgie Barnwell"
 547. No record
 548. "The Rich Merchant's Daughter", "Flower of London"
 549. "The Red River Shore" (Laws M26)
 550. "The Paisley Officer"
 551. "Lisbon", "William and Nancy/Polly"
 552. "The Silk Merchant's Daughter", "The Miser", "New York Streets"
 553. "Caroline and her Sailor Bold" (Laws N17)
 554. "The Prince of Morocco", "The Young Prince of Spain"
 555. "Kate and Her Horns", "The Clothier"
 556. "Love In a Tub", "The Old Miser Outwitted"
 557. "Johnny German"
 558. "Foggy Dew" (Laws O3)
 559. "Blackberry Fold"
 560. "William and Susan", "Black-eyed Susan"
 561. "Poor Mary in the Silvery Tide"
 562. "The Maid of the Sweet Brown Knowe"
 563. "Rambling Beauty", "The Widow's Daughter"
 564. "Blackwater Side" (Laws P18)
 565. "Bonny Irish Boy"
 566. "Barren Down Brae"
 567. "All Around My Hat", "The Nobleman's Wedding", "Another Man's Wedding" (Laws P31)
 568. "I Am a Sailor by My Right"
 569. "The Old Oak Tree"
 570. "The (Little Lousy) Tailor", "(There Was a / The) Jolly Boatman", "(The / The Old / Bold / The Bold) (Boatswain / Boatsman) Of Dover", "(The) (Boatswain / Sailor) and the Tailor", "Bold Bos'n", "(Tailor / The Boatsman / The Boatman) and the (Chest / Kist)", "The Jolly (Boatswain / Bosun)", "There Was a Wealthy Merchant", "The (Boatsman / Boatswain) and the Tailor", "The Sailor Boy", "The Tailor in the (Tea) Chest", "The (Deil / Devil) in the Kist", "The Old Bo's'n", "The Tailor and the Sailor", "The Bosun's Chest", "The Boatswain's (Honest) Wife", "Johnny's Gone to Sea", "The Boatman's Wife and the Tailor", "The Boatswain and the Lass that loves a Sailor", "The Bold Bo'sun", "The Jolly Sailor", "Old Sea Chest", "The (Little / Pretty) Tailor"
 571. "Lather and Shave"
 572. "The Turkey Factor", "The Factor's Garland"
 573. "Paper of Pins", "Blue Muslin", "The Marriage Song", "The Silver Pin"
 574. "Sucking Pig", "The Parson and the Pig"
 575. "Jan's Courtship", "Poor Bob", "Roger's Courtship"
 576. "Searching for Lambs"
 577. "Little Boney", "Boney's Total Defeat and Wellington's Victory"
 578. "The Maid in Bedlam", "The Loyal Lover"
 579. "I Shall Be Married Next Monday Morning"
 580. "Hare Hunting Song", "The Morning is Charming"
 581. "Jenny of the Moor"
 582. "The Tardy Wooer", "Gallant and Gay"
 583. "Cold Winter Is Past", "The Curragh of Kildare"
 584. "Dido and Spandigo", "Dido Bendigo", "The Duke's Hunt"
 585. "In Bibberley Town", "The Beverly Maid"
 586. "Banks of Sweet Primroses"
 587. "The Americans Have Stolen my True Love Away", "American King", "The Young Rival"
 588. "The Rifle Boys", "Success to the Blues"
 589. "Little Bingo"
 590. "Hodge of the Mill and Buxom Nell", "Roger of the Vale"
 591. "Once More A-lumb'ring Go"
 592. "Lovely Joan"
 593. "Farewell Lads and Lasses", "I live not where I love"
 594. "Queen of the May"
 595. "The Knight's Dream", "The Labouring Man's Daughter", "Cornish Young Man"
 596. "Farewell to Kingsbridge", "North Amerikay"
 597. "Sussex Carol", "On Christmas Night All Christians Sing"
 598. "Ratcliffe Highway"
 599. "Spurn Point", "The Wreck of the Industry"
 600. "Hills Of Caledonia", "Jamie/John Raeburn"

601 to 700 
 601. "The Old Miser", "The Sailor's Misfortune and Happy Marriage", "The Lady of Riches", "The Press Gang", "The Lady and the Sailor"
 602. "Our Captain Calls", "The Distressed Maid"
 603. "Banks of the Roses"
 604. "Welcome Sailor", "The Nightingale"
 605. "Through Moorfields"
 606. "The Brisk and Bonny Lad", "The Country Lass"
 607. "Through the Groves"
 608. "Cottage Near a Wood", "It's Forty Long Miles"
 609. "The Death of Bill Brown"
 610. "The Rippon Sword Dancers' Song", "Pace Egging Song"
 611. "Jack Donahoe"
 612. "Sidney Allen"
 613. "Boston Harbour"
 614. "Pace Egging Song"
 615. "He That Will Not Merry Be"
 616. "Heave Away", "We're All Bound to Go"
 617. "The Ages of Man"
 618. "Smuggler's Boy"
 619. "Honest Ploughman"
 620. "Poor Black Bess"
 621. "Turpin Hero"
 622. "Bloody Waterloo"
 623. "Andrew Rose", "Andrew Ross"
 624. "General Wolfe"
 625. "The Yankee Man-of-War", "The Stately Southerner"
 626. "Constitution and Guerrierre"
 627. "Young Edward", "The Battle of Mill Springs"
 628. "The Dying Ranger"
 629. "Two Soldiers", "The Fierce Last Charge", "The Battle of Gettysburg"
 630. "The Merrimac", "The Cumberland and the Merrimac"
 631. "The Dying Cowboy", "The Lone Prairie"
 632. "Billy Venero"
 633. "The Lonely Cowboy", "Cowboy's Home Sweet Home"
 634. "The Hills of Mexico", "Buffalo Skinners", "On the Trail of the Buffalo"
 635. "My Heart's Tonight in Texas"
 636. "Jimmy Judge"
 637. "Johnny Doyle", "Johnny Stiles"
 638. "Jim Whalen"
 639. "Harry Dunn"
 640. "Michigan-i-o", "Canaday-i-o", "The Jolly Lumberman"
 641. "The Backwoodsman"
 642. "Jack Haggerty"
 643. "The Rock Island Line"
 644. "Go to Sea Once More"
 645. "The Bigler's Crew"
 646. "Charles Augustus Anderson", "The Saladin Mutiny"
 647. "Bound Down to Newfoundland", "The Schooner Mary Ann"
 648. "The Gallant Brigantine"
 649. "The Maid of Amsterdam"
 650. "Johnny Come Down to Hilo"
 651. "Whiskey Johnny"
 652. "Haul on the Bowline"
 653. "Mainsail Haul", "Paddy Lay Back"
 654. "Still I Love Him", "The Black Shawl", "Do You Love an Apple?", "I'll Go With Him Wherever He Goes"
 655. "Death ('Tis/is) a Melancholy (Day/Call)", "Tribulation", "Awful Awful Awful"
 656. "The Little Family", "Bethany"
 657. "Amanda (the Captive/and Albin)", "(Her/The) White Bosom Bare", "(The) White (Maiden) Captive", "Young Albin", "Olban", "Young Alban and Amandy", "Lamanda", "The Wild Mustard River", "(Bright/Sufferings of) Amanda" (Laws H15)
 658. "Burglar Man" (Laws H23)
 659. "(Courting) the Widow's Daughter", "The Widow's (Old Broom/A-courtin')", "Last Saturday Night (Was Jolly/I Entered a House)", "Hard Times", "Johnny Mccardner", "Billy B. Madison" (Laws H25)
 660. "Pleasant and Delightful"
 661. "Peggy (Band/Bawn/Bond/Bain/Ban/Bann)", "Peggy Bawn's Air", "As I Went O'er", "A Song About a Man-of-war", "Ireland Hill", "As I Walked O'er the Highland Hills", "Sweet Island's Hill"
 662. "The Press Gang", "Man of War"
 663. "Fountain of Christ's Blood"
 664. "The Bonny Bunch of Roses" (Laws J5)
 665. "The Birmingham Boys"
 666. "Widdliecombe Fair", "Monaghan Fair"
 667. "Shanty Boys in the Pine", "Jim Lockwood"
 668. "Peter Emberly" (Laws C27)
 669. "River in the Pines" (Laws dC33)
 670. "(The) Shanty Boy (Wins)", "Trenton Town", "(The Shanty Boy and) the Mossback", "The Farmer's Son and the Shanty Boy", "Shanty Boys", "The Farmer and the Shanty Boy", "Shanty Boy Farmer Boy", "Shanty Girl", "The Shanty-boy and the Farmer's Son", "The Moss-back and the Shanty Boy", "The Shanty Boy and the Farmer"
 671. "The Journeyman Tailor", "The Jolly Stage Driver" (Laws O13)
 672. "One Night As I Lay On My Bed"
 673. "Bold Manning" (Laws D15)
 674. "Katie Mora" (Laws N24)
 675. "The Merchant's Daughter", "Constant Farmer's Son" (Laws M33)
 676. "Dennis O'Reilly"
 677. "Wild Colonial Boy" (Laws L20)
 678. "Mrs. McGrath", "Mrs. McGraw", "My Son Ted", "My Son John", "The Sergeant and Mrs. McGrath"
 679. "The Eumerella Shore"
 680. "Grey Mare", "Roger the Miller" (Laws P8)
 681. "Lowlands"
 682. "The First Nowell"
 683. "The North Country Collier"
 684. No record
 685. "The Girl I Left Behind Me", "Blyth Camps"
 686. "Oxen Ploughing"
 687. "Spanish Ladies"
 688. "The Streams of Lovely Nancy"
 689. "Wicklow Rangers", "The Girl I Left Behind Me"
 690. "The Dolphin", "Lord Exmouth", "The Warlike Seaman"
 691. "Bob Sims", "Logan County Jailhouse", "Sporting Cowboy" (Laws E17)
 692. "The Death of J.B. Marcum" (Laws E19)
 693. "Henry Green" (Laws F14)
 694. "Fuller and Warren" (Laws F16)
 695. "Ellen Flannery", "Floyd Frasier" (Laws F19)
 696. "Little Mary Phagan" (Laws F20)
 697. "Charlie Lawson", "The Lawson Murder" (Laws F35)
 698. "The Mines of Avondale" (Laws G6)
 699. "Ten Thousand Miles Away from Home", "Western Hobo" (Laws H2)
 700. "I Saw Three Ships", "The Sunny Bank"

701 to 800 
 701. "New Years Carol", "Awake Awake"
 702. "The Moon Shines Bright"
 703. "Blow Boys Blow"
 704. "One More Day"
 705. "Silver Jack" (Laws C24)
 706. "The Banks of Little Eau Plain", "Johnny Murphy" (Laws C2)
 707. "The Cumberland's Crew" (Laws A18)
 708. "Gay Spanish Maid" (Laws K16)
 709. "The White Cockade"
 710. "Away to California", "The Wisconsin Emigrant" (Laws B25)
 711. "Silver Dagger"
 712. "Wreck of the Six Wheeler", "Jay Gould's Daughter" (Laws I16 / Laws dl25)
 713. "Mary's Dream" (Laws K20)
 714. "Mantle of Green" (Laws N38)
 715. "Beaver Creek"
 716. "The Quaker's Courtship"
 717. No record
 718. No record
 719. "The Old Maid's Song"
 720. No record
 721. "Drunkard's Hell"
 722. "Husband's Dream"
 723. "The Drunkard's Lone Child"
 724. "For Seven Long Years I've Been Married"
 725. "Little Brown Jug"
 726. No record
 727. "When I Die", "Grease My Heels"
 728. "Old Adam", "When Adam was first created"
 729. "Charlie", "Weevily Wheat", "O'er the Water to Charlie"
 730. "Three Dukes", "The Dilsey Dolsey Officer"
 731. "Jenny Jenkins"
 732. No record
 733. "The Jolly Miller"
 734. "In and Out the Window", "Round and Round the Village"
 735. "Pretty Little Pink", "Green Coffee"
 736. "Little Fight in Mexico"
 737. No record
 738. "Buffalo Gals"
 739. "Sally Goodin"
 740. "I Love Coffee"
 741. "Uncle Joe Cut off His Toe"
 742. "The Grand Old Duke of York"
 743. No record
 744. No record
 745. "Old McDonald Had a Farm", "The Farmyard", "The Merry Green Fields (of the Lowland)"
 746. "The Old Woman and her Pig", "Little Betty Pringle"
 747. "The Woodpecker", "Bird Song"
 748. "Jaybird Died with the Whooping Cough"
 749. No record
 750. "I Had a Little Sweetheart"
 751. "The Old Gray Mare"
 752. "The Jackfish", "Fish on a Hook"
 753. "Bob Ridley'"
 754. "Sourwood Mountain"
 755. No record
 756. "Red River Valley"
 757. "Wildwood Flower"
 758. No record
 759. "Gum Tree Canoe"
 760. "See the Train go Round the Bend", "Goodbye My Lover Goodbye", "I Saw the Ship Go Round the Bend"
 761. "Someone's Tall and Handsome"
 762. "Bonnie Blue Eyes"
 763. "I Love Little Willie"
 764. "Old Grimes"
 765. "Twenty Years Ago"
 766. "History of the World", "Walk in the Parlor"
 767. "Meet Me By Moonlight"
 768. "May I Sleep in Your Barn Tonight Mister"
 769. "The Red White and Red" (Laws dA36)
 770. "Bluebird"
 771. "John Brown's Body"
 772. "Sweet Sunny South"
 773. "The Drummer Boy of Shiloh" (Laws A15)
 774. "The Titanic"
 775. "The Ship that Never Returned" (Laws D27)
 776. "Aunt Sal's Song", "The Bashful Courtship"
 777. "Wreck of the Old 97"
 778. "Kingdom Coming", "The Year of Jubilo"
 779. "Battleship of Maine"
 780. "Little Sadie"
 781. "Little Marian Parker" (Laws F33)
 782. "Give to My Love Nell", "Jack and Joe"
 783. "Frankie Silver" (Laws E13)
 784. "Charlie Brook"
 785. "Dublin Bay"
 786. "Young Companions", "Bad Company" (Laws E15)
 787. "White House Blues", "Unlucky Road to Washington"
 788. "Farewell Dear Roseanna" (Laws M30)
 789. "I'm Going Back to North Carolina"
 790. "John Henry" (Laws I1)
 791. No record
 792. "My Mistress Came to the Door", "Rap-Tap-Tap", "The Farmer's Servant", "The Thresher in the Barn"
 793. "The Poacher's Fate", "The Gallant Poacher", "Come All You Lads of High Renown".
 794. "The Bonnie House of Airlie" (Child 199)
 795. "The Boyne Water"
 796. "The Ranger", "Three Huntsmen", "Tom Reynard"
 797. "Old Roger"
 798. "Major Andre's Death", "John Paulan", (Laws A2)
 799. "The Government Claim", "Starving to Death on a Government Claim", "The Lane County Bachelor", "Greer County"
 800. "Bright Sunny South" (Laws A23)

801 to 900 
 801. No record
 802. "Tinker, Tailor"
 803. "Farewell, He"
 804. No record
 805. No record
 806. "Bob of Dumblane"
 807. "The Ship in Distress"
 808. "Christmas Drawing Near at Hand"
 809. "Haul Away Joe", "Haul Away for Rosie"
 810. "Clear the Track", "Let the Bullgine Run"
 811. "The Valiant Sailor", "The Sailor's Wish", "Polly on the Shore"
 812. "Rosebuds in June", "Sheepshearer Song"
 813. "Fire Down Below"
 814. "So Handy", "Hand Over Hand"
 815. "The Angel Gabriel", "Lazerus", "Come All You Worthy Christian Men"
 816. "The Blacksmith"
 817. "Sweet Moll"
 818. "Three Lovely Lasses in Bannion"
 819. "Bonnet So Blue"
 820. "Burns and Highland Mary" (Laws O34)
 821. "What Are Little Boys Made Of?"
 822. "Durant Jail"
 823. "The Good Old Rebel"
 824. "Lonesome Road"
 825. "Liza Jane"
 826. "What'll I Do with the Baby-o", "Georgie"
 827. "Git Along, Little Dogies"
 828. "The Chapter of Cheats", "Every Man is a Rogue"
 829. "Rakish Young Fellow"
 830. "The Heights of Alma" (Laws J10)
 831. "The Bunch of Rushes"
 832. "Oh No No", "Bonny Glenshee"
 833. "The Mower"
 834. "The Blind Sailors" (Laws K5)
 835. "Captain James", "The Captain's Apprentice"
 836. "Cindy"
 837. "Shoemaker's Song", "The Cobbler"
 838. "The Dreary Dreary Life" (Laws B16)
 839. "Come Home, Father"
 840. No record
 841. No record
 842. "I am a Driver"
 843. "Come All Ye Lonely Lovers"
 844. "The Coal Creek Explosion", "Shut Up In the Mines of Cold Creek" (Laws G9)
 845. "Johnnie My Man"
 846. "Slighted Nansy", "Nobody Coming to Marry Me"
 847. "Joe Moggins"
 848. "What's the Life of a Man?"
 849. "Bewick and Graham" (Child 211)
 850. "My Father Kept a Horse"
 851. "You Subjects of England", "William Tayor the Poacher", "Keepers and Poachers"
 852. "Mandi Went to Puv the Grai", "All Through Me Rakli"
 853. "The King and the Forester", "King William and the Keeper"
 854. "Sweet Blooming Lavender", "Lavender Cry"
 855. "Joy After Sorrow", "Raking the Hay"
 856. "Death of Black Bess"
 857. "Ca' the Ewes to the Knowes", "The Ewe Lamb"
 858. "I Wonder What's Keeping My True Love Tonight", "I'm Sorry", "The Rue and Thyme", "Green Grass it Grows Bonny"
 859. No record
 860. "Sheffield Park"
 861. "She Moved Through the Fair"
 862. "The Jolly Driver"
 863. "The Jolly Tinker"
 864. "The Laird of the Dainty Doonby"
 865. "Baffled Knight"
 866. "The Overgate"
 867. "The Brewer Laddie"
 868. "Countryman's Ramble in Cheapside", "Up to the Rigs"
 869. "Dashing Away with the Smoothing Iron"
 870. "My Husband's Got No Courage In Him"
 871. No record
 872. "Dick Darby the Cobbler"
 873. "The Husbandman and the Servingman"
 874. "The Threshing Song"
 875. "The Oyster Girl"
 876. "Hard, Hard Times"
 877. "Six Jolly Miners"
 878. "The Echoing Horn"
 879. "The Industrious Farmer", "The Sheepsheering Song"
 880. "Fathom the Bowl"
 881. "Campbell the Driver", "Three English Blades"
 882. "Drink Old England Dry", "Cannons"
 883. "Nancy Whisky"
 884. "Card Playing Song", "Tom Brown"
 885. "To Be a Good Companion", "The Sussex Toast"
 886. "The Wonderful Crocodile"
 887. "The Farmyard Song"
 888. "The Buchan Miller"
 889. "Banks of the Bann"
 890. "Maxwell's Doom", "Ewing Brooks" (Laws E12)
 891. "The Carrion Crow"
 892. "The Merchant's Daughter of Bristol"
 893. "Old Erin Far Away", "The Dying Soldier" (Laws J7)
 894. "The Maid and Wife"
 895. "The Lass's Wardrobe"
 896. "The Gallows" (Laws L11)
 898. "The Parcel from a Lady"
 897. "The Folkestone Murder"
 899. "Underneath Her Apron", "Gathering Rushes in the Month of May"
 900. "Little Beggarman"

901 to 1000
 901. "The Lost Lady Found" (Laws Q31)
 902. "Shooting Goshen's Cocks Up", "The Poaching Song", "Row-Dow-Dow"
 903. "The Prentice Boy" (Laws M12)
 904. "High Germany"
 905. "Little Boy Billee"
 906. "Roll on Silvery Moon", "Bonnie Moon"
 907. "Peggy and the Soldier", "The Old Soldier", "A New Ballad of the Souldier and Peggy" (Laws P13)
 908. No record
 909. No record
 910. "Besom Maker"
 911. "Siúil A Rún"
 912. "Fisherman's Boy" (Laws Q29)
 913. "Jolly Roving Tar" (Laws O27)
 914. "I Sowed Some Seeds", "The Hostess' Daughter", "London Town"
 915. "Old Paint"
 916. "Lovely Jimmy", "In Bristol There Lived a Fair Lady"
 917. "The Watchet Sailor" (Laws P4)
 918. "Monkey Turned Barber" (Laws Q14)
 919. "Jack Tar on Shore" (Laws K39)
 920. "Johnny Galocher"
 921. "The Collier Lad"
 922. "Lawyer Lee", "The Lawyer Bold"
 923. "Paddy Haggerty's Breeches"
 924. "The Flash Frigate" (Laws D13)
 925. "On Board the Kangaroo"
 926. "A Hundred Years Ago"
 927. "Homeward Bound"
 928. "Liverpool Judies"
 929. "Ballytrapeen", "Swansea Gals"
 930. "He Back She Back"
 931. "Shuile Agra", "Blood Red Roses"
 932. "Heave Away Cheerily"
 933. "Robin Hood and the Ranger" (Child 131)
 934. "Bucking Bronco" (Laws B15)
 935. "Grat for Gruel"
 936. "The Nativity", "Sherburne"
 937. "Jone O'Grinfield", "Four Loom Weaver"
 938. "A Bucket of Mountain Dew"
 939. "Robin Tamson's Dochter" (Laws O12)
 940. "Sad Condition", "Old Jim Lane"
 941. "Rye Whiskey", "I'll Eat When I'm Hungry"
 942. "Cotton-Eyed Joe"
 943. "Birmingham Jail"
 944. "The Barley Mow"
 945. "Young Willie", "Valentine's Day"
 946. "Going to Chelsea"
 947. "The Sea Captain" (Laws Q12)
 948. "Fair Floro", "The Unkind Shepherdess"
 949. "The Storm"
 950. "Banks of the Nile" (Laws N9)
 951. "Captain Mansfield's Fight with the Turks at Sea", "The Twenty Fourth of February", "The Good Luck Ship"
 952. "Single Life", "The Lady of Greenwich", "Jolly Sailor"
 953. "Willie Graham"
 954. "Flash Company", "The Wandering Girl"
 955. "Young Barnwell"
 956. "The Spotted Cow"
 957. "Flora the Lily of the West" (Laws P29)
 958. "The Drums They Play for War" (Laws N9)
 959. "The Sailor and the Shepherdess", "The Sailor's Courtship" (Laws O8)
 960. "Waterloo" (Laws N32)
 961. "Brave Wolfe"
 962. "Pretty Susan the Pride of Kildare" (Laws P6)
 963. "Battle of Shannon and Chesapeake" (Laws J22)
 964. "County Gaol"
 965. "Timothy", "As I Was a Walking", "The Fair Maid"
 966. "Go From My Window"
 967. "Paul Jones" (Laws A4)
 968. "Bedlam City", "Do You See Billy Coming"
 969. "Limbo", "The Prodigal Son"
 970. "The Whaler's Song", "Greenland"
 971. "The Stonecutter Boy/The Bricklayer's Dream", "The Brickster"
 972. "Starry Night for a Ramble"
 973. "The Foggy Dew"
 974. "Plaster", "Sheep's Skin and Beeswax"
 975. "Jack Stewart", "Man You Don't Meet Every Day"
 976. No record
 977. "Willie the Weeper"
 978. "Kenny Wagner" (Laws E7)
 979. No record
 980. "The Fourteenth of July" (Laws J19)
 981. "Naomi Wise" (Laws F31)
 982. "Bold Belfast Shoemaker" (Laws J15)
 983. "Patrick Shean" (Laws J11)
 984. "The Bold Pirate" (Laws K30)
 985. "Rigs O' Rye" (Laws O11)
 986. "Cupid the Pretty Plowboy" (Laws O7)
 987. "Green Mossy Banks" (Laws O15)
 988. "The Slighted Soldier" (Laws O16)
 989. "Bonnie Wee Widow" (Laws O18)
 990. "A Man in Love He Feels No Cold" (Laws O20)
 991. "The Most Unconstant of Young Men", "Nancy's Courtship", "True Lovers' Discussion" (Laws O22)
 992. "Kate Avourneen", "Barney and Kate" (Laws O21)
 993. "The Constant Lovers", "The Sailor and the Farmer's Daughter" (Laws O41)
 994. "Lady and the Farmer's Son" (Laws O40)
 995. "The Lovely Banks of the Boyne" (Laws P22)
 996. "All On Account of a Bold Lover Gay" (Laws P23)
 997. "The Perjured Maid", "A Gentleman of Exeter", "A Ring of Gold They Broke in Two" (Laws P32)
 998. "Susannah Clargy" (Laws P33)
 999. "Dobbin's Flowery Vale" (Laws O29)
 1000. "The Bold Privateer" (Laws O32)

1001 to 1100
 1001. "Fair Fanny Moore" (Laws O38)
 1002. "Jenny Dear" (Laws P11)
 1003. "As I Walked Out One May Morning", "A Day Too Young" (Laws P19)
 1004. "Battle of the Ladle" (Laws Q7)
 1005. "Major's Britches", "The Miller and the Major" (Laws Q10)
 1006. "The Old Dyer", "The Dog in the Closet" (Laws Q11)
 1007. "Courting in the Kitchen" (Laws Q16)
 1008. "Pat Malone Forgot He Was Dead", "The Irish Wake" (Laws Q18)
 1009. "Finnegan's Wake" (Laws Q17)
 1010. "Doran's Ass" (Laws Q19)
 1011. "Our Ship She Lays in Harbour"
 1012. "Creeping Jane" (Laws Q23)
 1013. "Father Tom O'Neale" (Laws Q25)
 1014. "The High Blantyre Explosion"
 1015. "The Miner's Doom" (Laws Q36)
 1016. "The London Prentice" (Laws Q38)
 1017. "Devilish Mary" (Laws Q4)
 1018. "The Wanton Seed", "The Lamentation for Willie Lenox", "The Building of Solomon's Temple" (Laws Q39)
 1019. "The North Star", "The Merchant's Son and the Parson's Daughter" (Laws M21)
 1020. "Gragal Machree" (Laws M23)
 1021. "The Tan-yard Side" (Laws M28)
 1022. "The Plymouth Tragedy" (Laws M29)
 1023. No record
 1024. "Barley Rakings"
 1025. "Blow Away Ye Morning Breezes"
 1026. "Chase the Buffalo"
 1027. "Bushes and Briers"
 1028. "Catch Me If You Can"
 1029. "Come All You Lads and Lasses"
 1030. "The Croppy Boy" (Laws J14)
 1031. "Death and the Lady"
 1032. "The Death of Parker"
 1033. "Dicky the Miller"
 1034. "Let Him Go Let Him Tarry", "Fare Thee Well Cold Winter"
 1035. "Fare Thee Well My Dearest Dear"
 1036. "Four and Twenty Tailors"
 1037. "The Furze Field", "The Jolly Huntsman's Call"
 1038. "Gosport Beach"
 1039. "Gossip Joan"
 1040. "Green Bushes" (Laws P2)
 1041. "Hunting the Hare"
 1042. "I am a Brisk Young Sailor"
 1043. "I am a Coachman", "Jack of All Trades"
 1044. "Nottamun Town"
 1045. "I Rode My Little Horse", "The London Rover"
 1046. "Holmfirth Anthem", "Pratty Flowers", "Through the Groves", "Abroad for Pleasure"
 1047. "Jenny Jones"
 1048. "Jolly Old Hawk"
 1049. "Love is Pleasing"
 1050. "The Derbyshire Miller", "Matthew the Miller", "My Tipper-to-billy-go-lario"
 1051. "May and December"
 1052. "The Molecatcher"
 1053. No record
 1054. "New Garden Fields"
 1055. "The Shepherd's Wife", "Shepherd, O Shepherd"
 1056. "Faithful Lovers"
 1057. "Old Mother Crawley"
 1058. "Bristol Town"
 1059. "I Must Live All Alone", "As I was A-Walking"
 1060. "The Farmer's Daughter and the Gay Ploughboy"
 1061. "Wealthy Farmer's Son"
 1062. "Belfast Mountains"
 1063. "The Lady and the Farmer"
 1064. "Poor Murdered Woman"
 1065. "The Hampshire Mummers' Christmas Carol", "God Sent for Us the Sunday"
 1066. "The Mummers' Carol", "God Bless the Master"
 1067. "Jovial Ranger"
 1068. "Yarmouth is a Pretty Town"
 1069. "Oh Dickey, Oh Dickey"
 1070. "The Virgin's Wreath"
 1071. "A New Flounce to your Gown", "Weigh Anchor", "Little Miss Nancy"
 1072. "The Hawthorn Bush"
 1073. "Turkey Rhubarb"
 1074. "The Maid's Lament"
 1075. "The Wheel of Fortune"
 1076. "Tartar Drum", "Follow the Drum"
 1077. "Gaol Song"
 1078. "On Christmas Day It Happened So"
 1079. "The Cruise of the Calabar"
 1080. "Joe the Carrier Lad", "Jim the Carter's Lad"
 1081. "The American Stranger"
 1082. "Bold Nevison the Highwayman"
 1083. "Brigg Fair"
 1084. "Free and Easy to Jog Along", "Free and Easy"
 1085. "Gown so Green"
 1086. "Howden Fair"
 1087. "British Waterside (The Jolly Sailor)"
 1088. "The Jolly Waggoner"
 1089. "Bill Scrimshaw the Scotsman", "The Lincolnshire Wrestler", "The Wrestling Match"
 1090. "The Spinning Wheel"
 1091. No record
 1092. "Come All Ye Bold Countrymen"
 1093. "The Nightingale"
 1094. "The Grey Goose and Gander"
 1095. "Highland Mary"
 1096. "Braes of Strathblane"
 1097. No record
 1098. "Mammy's Pet"
 1099. "Maggie's Smile"
 1100. No record

1101 to 1200

 1101. "Glowerowerem", "Bonny Balcairn"
 1102. "Johnny Todd", "Dig for Silver", "Johnnie Johnston"
 1103. "Captain Death"
 1104. "Outward Bound"
 1105. "Just As the Tide Was Flowing"
 1106. "The Plains of Waterloo" (Laws J3)
 1107. "Spence Broughton"
 1108. "Awful Execution of John Bird Bell"
 1109. "The Flyingdale Fox Hunt"
 1110. "White Hare"
 1111. "The Roving Heckler Lad"
 1112. "The Rover"
 1113. "Down in the Village", "Shepherd Boy"
 1114. "Down by the Derwent Side"
 1115. "Spencer the Rover"
 1116. "I Love Sixpence"
 1117. "With Henry Hunt We'll Go"
 1118. "The Foggy Dew"
 1119. No record
 1120. "Stolen Child"
 1121. "Remember the Poor"
 1122. "Christ was Born in Bethlehem", "Down Came an Angel"
 1123. "Clean Pea Straw", "The Best Bed's a Featherbed"
 1124. No record
 1125. "Sally's Love for a Young Man", "The Jaunting Car"
 1126. "Chainmaker Lad"
 1127. "He's Only a Chimney Sweeper"
 1128. "The Miller and the Lass"
 1129. "Jolly Joe the Collier's Son"
 1130. "Poll and Nancy Hogan"
 1131. "The Dudley Boys"
 1132. "The Battle of Waterloo"
 1133. "When You Get Up in the Morning"
 1134. "Stop that Clock"
 1135. "Early in the Morning"
 1136. "The Old Miner"
 1137. "No Irish Need Apply"
 1138. No record
 1139. "Rakish Young Fellow"
 1140. "The Fox and the Hare"
 1141. No record
 1142. "Valentine Chant"
 1143. "Mowing Match Song"
 1144. "Lace Tell"
 1145. "The Magpie"
 1146. "The Gallant Hussar"
 1147. "Jerusalem Cuckoo"
 1148. "McCafferty"
 1149. "When Frost is on the Pumpkin"
 1150. No record
 1151. "Unfortunate Shepherdess"
 1152. "Father's Advice"
 1153. "Kiss Me Quick"
 1154. "Parson and the Clerk"
 1155. "Lincolnshire Wedding Song", "The Wedding Song"
 1156. "Labouring Man"
 1157. "The Sons of Albion"
 1158. "Rochester Lass"
 1159. "Rejoice the Promis'd Savior's Come", "First Carol"
 1160. No record
 1161. "Reilly's Daughter", "The One-eyed Riley"
 1162. "The Bonny Labouring Boy"
 1163. "The Egloshayle Ringers"
 1164. "Old King Cole"
 1165. "The Drunkard"
 1166. "General Munroe"
 1167. "Come All Ye Brisk Young Bachelors"
 1168. "The Cabin Boy", "The Rich Lady Gay"
 1169. No record
 1170. "The Trees are All Bare", "Christmas Song"
 1171. "'Twas in the Year of 1835"
 1172. "We'll Go A-Hunting Today"
 1173. "The Wild Rover"
 1174. "The Wreck of the Northfleet", "Father Put Me in the Boat"
 1175. "Good Morning, Pretty Maid"
 1176. No record
 1177. "Hunting Song"
 1178. "The Old Farmer"
 1179. "Freemasons' Song"
 1180. "Four Seasons of the Year"
 1181. "The Sportsman's Game", "Somersetshire Hunting Song"
 1182. "The Fox Chase"
 1183. "The Barbel"
 1184. "Nothing at All"
 1185. "Bonny Light Horseman"
 1186. "Jolly Young Waterman"
 1187. "Britons Strike Home"
 1188. "Polka Mad"
 1189. "Grand Conversation on Napoleon"
 1190. "The Churchwarden's Song"
 1191. "Ye Mariners All", "A Jug of This"
 1192. "Rosin the Bow", "Old Rosin the Beau"
 1193. "The New-Mown Hay"
 1194. "Old Bedstead"
 1195. "Grandmother's Chair"
 1196. "The Body-Snatcher's Trade"
 1197. "A Poor Lonely Widow"
 1198. "The Modest Maid"
 1199. "Blow the Winds I-o"
 1200. "The Female Smuggler"

1201 to 1300

 1201. No record
 1202. "Rose in June"
 1203. No record
 1204. "Winchester Gaol"
 1205. "The Brisk Young Ploughboy", "The Brave Ploughboy"
 1206. "Hard Times of Old England"
 1207. "Shepherds Arise"
 1208. "The Shepherd's Song"
 1209. "Dame Durden"
 1210. "Now All You Lads"
 1211. No record
 1212. "Rumpsy Bumpsy"
 1213. "Charming Molly"
 1214. "Come All You Bold Britons"
 1215. "The Shepherd Adonis"
 1216. "Sportsmen Arouse", "Innocent Hare"
 1217. "Sweep Chimney Sweep"
 1218. "The Rose of Allandale" (Charles Jefferys, Sidney Nelson)
 1219. "Suit of Corduroy"
 1220. "Thousands or More"
 1221. "The Battle of Alma"
 1222. "Softly the Night"
 1223. "British Soldier's Grave"
 1224. "Essex Hawkey Encore", "Jolly Good Song"
 1225. "Corydon and Phillis"
 1226. "The Shearer's Song"
 1227. "A-Begging Buttermilk", "To Curb Rising Thoughts"
 1228. "Good Company"
 1229. "Music and Wine"
 1230. "How Happy is the Man"
 1231. "How I Could Ride", "Dumy Dum Darie"
 1232. "Here's a Health to King George"
 1233. "Now So Merry We Have Met"
 1234. "Come Landlord Fill the Flowing Bowl"
 1235. "Here's a Health to All Good Lasses"
 1236. "Come You Friends of a Social Life"
 1237. "The Bonny Christ Church Bells", "Hark the Bonny"
 1238. "Come My Lads"
 1239. "John Peel"
 1240. "Old Towler"
 1241. "Chivvy Chivvy O"
 1242. "Tally I-o In the Morning"
 1243. "Hark Hark Away to the Downs"
 1244. "The Gipsies' Glee", "What a Merry Life We Gipsies Lead"
 1245. "Days When We Went a Gypsying"
 1246. "The Lass of Richmond Hill"
 1247. "Garland of Love"
 1248. "Old Simon"
 1249. "Three Jolly Bachelors"
 1250. "Fairlop Fair"
 1251. "Ere Round the Huge Oak"
 1252. "The Social Fellows"
 1253. "Push About the Pitcher"
 1254. "The Rich and the Poor"
 1255. "Toast"
 1256. No record
 1257. "The Pretty Chambermaid"
 1258. No record
 1259. "Gipsy King"
 1260. "Off to Flanders", "The Coward"
 1261. "The Cluster of Nuts"
 1262. "In Former Times"
 1263. "My Old Wife"
 1264. "The Sowers' Song"
 1265. "A-Courting I Went", "Nothing Else to Do"
 1266. "The Fatal Ramilies"
 1267. No record
 1268. "Eynsham Poaching Song", "Southrop Poaching Song", "The Three Poachers"
 1269. "Ground For the Floor"
 1270. "My Cottage Well Thatched with Straw"
 1271. "Village Fair"
 1272. "The Shepherd and the Maiden"
 1273. "Dainty Davy in the Hog Tub", "Pig's Meat Courtship", "It's Once I Courted", "Swim for Love in the Hog-Tub", "She Bundled Me Into the Hog Tub"
 1274. "Blue Tail Fly"
 1275. "The Recruiting Sargeant"
 1276. "The Maid of the Mill"
 1277. "The Weaver's Daughter"
 1278. No record
 1279.  "O Dear What Can the Matter Be", "Bunch of Blue Ribbons"
 1280. "We'll Sit Upon the Gate"
 1281. "Brave Old Oak"
 1282. "All Around the Room"
 1283. "All Among the Barley" (Elizabeth Stirling)
 1284. "The Snail"
 1285. "Bonnie Hodge"
 1286. "Captain Grant"
 1287. "Long Tail Blue"
 1288. "Betsy Baker"
 1289. "There Was a Little Man"
 1290. "Three Flies"
 1291. "The Football Match"
 1292. "John Appleby"
 1293. "I'm His Only Daughter"
 1294. "Harvest Home"
 1295. "What Can a Young Lassie"
 1296. "The Pigeon"
 1297. "The Wee Wifie", "The Old Woman Tossed Up in a Blanket"
 1298. "From the Brow of the Hill"
 1299. "Hark the Rock", "Cease Ye Stormy Winds to Blow", "The Wanderer"
 1300. "Needlecases"

1301 to 1400

 1301. "Love Farewell", "The Harvest Shearin'", "John and Molly Lay A-Musing"
 1302. "Soldier Boy for Me", "The Railroader"
 1303. "Bold Robin Hood"
 1304. "The Beggar Girl"
 1305. "Generous Farmer"
 1306. "My Own Dear Home"
 1307. "Leather Bottle"
 1308. "The Down-Hill of Life", "Tomorrow"
 1309. "The Mailman and the Miller", "The Maltman and the Highwayman"
 1310. "The Old Woman Drinking her Tea"
 1311. "The Wooden Watch"
 1312. "Jarvis the Coachman('s Happy Deliverance from the Gibbet)"
 1313. "The Cruel Gamekeeper", "The Staffordshire Tragedy"
 1314. "The Devil and the Hackney Coachman", "Tamarro"
 1315. "The Female Robber"
 1316. "Struggle for the Breeches"
 1317. "Preaching for Bacon"
 1318. "Two Wenches at Once"
 1319. "George Ridler's Oven"
 1320. "Life Let us Cherish"
 1321. "Dicky Milburn", "Little Dicky Whilburn"
 1322. "Robin Hood and Little John" (Child 125)
 1323. "The Saucy Light Dragoon"
 1324. "Follow Me (To the Greenwood Tree)"
 1325. "The Age of Man and Woman", "The Four Ages of Mankind", "An Ape Lion Fox and Ass"
 1326. "A Grasshopper and a Fly"
 1327. "The Cobbler's Bill"
 1328. "The Miser"
 1329. "Old Johnny Boker"
 1330. "When Moggy by the Fire Sat"
 1331. "Morris Fragment"
 1332. "Money Makes the Mare Go"
 1333. "'Twas You Sir"
 1334. "Poor Johnny's Dead"
 1335. "Chairs to Mend", "If I'd As Much Money", "Chair-Mender's Cry"
 1336. "Come Hither Tom"
 1337. "William and Jonathan"
 1338. "Old Simeon"
 1339. "Home to Dinner"
 1340. No record
 1341. "Fill the Foaming Horn up High"
 1342. "Well Rung Tom"
 1343. "Ill Fares the Family"
 1344. "Fill a Glass of Sherry"
 1345. "Slaves to the World"
 1346. "Hail Smiling Morn"
 1347. "Roundelay"
 1348. "Music and Love"
 1349. "Sweet Kitty"
 1350. "The Twa Magicians" (Child 44)
 1351. "The Bold Richard"
 1352. No record
 1353. "Now the Winter is Over", "The Ploughboy"
 1354. "Young William of the Royal Waggon Train"
 1355. "There Goes a Man (Just Gone Along)", "The Gaol Song"
 1356. No record
 1357. "Song of Want", "Truth Laid Open", "The Brewer without Any Barm"
 1358. No record
 1359. "Bobby Shafto"
 1360. "Joseph and his Wedded Wife"
 1361. "The Lord of Life"
 1362. "Over the Hills and the Mountains"
 1363. No record
 1364. "The Water of Tyne"
 1365. "Sally Gray"
 1366. "The Collier’s Rant"
 1367. "The Oak and the Ash"
 1368. "Green Gravel"
 1369. "There Was a Pig Went Out to Dig"
 1370. "The Cheshire Cheese", "The Cheshireman and the Spaniard"
 1371. "Ny Kirree Fo-sniaghtey"
 1372. "The Spider"
 1373. "Now Robin Lend Me Thy Bow"
 1374. "In Bethlehem City"
 1375. "The Reaphook and the Sickle"
 1376. "Turmot Hoer"
 1377. "Poor Mary (Sits A-Weeping)"
 1378. "A Virgin Most Pure"
 1379. "When Sheapshearing's Done", "Gloucester Feast Song"
 1380. "Oats Peas Beans and Barley Grow"
 1381. "Green Grass", "A Dis a Dis a Green Grass",
 1382. "The Dashing Lad from Buckingham"
 1383. "Venus and Adonis"
 1384. "Bob-Tailed Mare", "The Carter's Health"
 1385. "Sheep-Shearing Song"
 1386. "I'm A Man that's Done Wrong (By My Parents)", "The Cast Out"
 1387. "Adam and Eve"
 1388. "My Johnny Was a Shoemaker"
 1389. "Bobbing Around"
 1390. "The Frightened Husband", "Marco and Pedro"
 1391. "The Crystal Spring"
 1392. "Horse Racing Song"
 1393. "Fanny Blair"
 1394. "We Poor Labouring Men"
 1395. "The Cuckoo"
 1396. "As Robin was Driving", "Bonny Robin"
 1397. No record
 1398. "The Servant Man"
 1399. "Mick Miles"
 1400. "The Country Carrier"

1401 to 1500
 1401. "I Wish They'd Do It Now"
 1402. "The Beautiful Muff"
 1403. "No My Love Not I", "The Newfoundland Sailor"
 1404. "Little Ball of Yarn"
 1405. "Mr. Noah"
 1406. "Owd Johnny Walker"
 1407. "Are You the O'Reilly", "Man all Tattered and Torn"
 1408. "Rattle Mutton Pie", "Owd Sow T'"
 1409. "A Country Life for Me"
 1410. "Round the Lunatic Asylum"
 1411. "Little Blue Haired Boy"
 1412. "James MacDonald", "The Longford Murderer"
 1413. No record
 1414. "The False Young Man", "In London Town", "In Camden Town", "Floating Down the Tide"
 1415. "Banks of Inverary"
 1416. "The Lass of Swansea Town", "Swansea Barracks"
 1417. "Weddingmore", "Young Ellender"
 1418. "My Lagan Love"
 1419. "The Shamrock Shore", "Greencastle Shore"
 1420. "Slieve Gallion Braes"
 1421. "Derry so Fair"
 1422. "My Bonnie Lies over the Ocean"
 1423. "Betsy of Ballantown Brae"
 1424. "A Ship to Old England Came"
 1425. No record
 1426. "Old Brown's Daughter"
 1427. "Erin's Lovely Home"
 1428. "The Rolling Main"
 1429. "William and Phillis"
 1430. No record
 1431. "The Wounded Farmer's Son"
 1432. "The Pleasant Month of May"
 1433. "The Shepherd and his Fife"
 1434. "Master Kilby"
 1435. No record
 1436. "Henry and Nancy"
 1437. "Searching for Young Lambs", "As Johnny Walked Out"
 1438. "Down By a Riverside"
 1439. "Ruth Butcher"
 1440. "Household Remedies", "It's a Wonder I'm Alive to Tell This Tale"
 1441. "Grace Darling"
 1442. "Dark Arches"
 1443. "Balaclava"
 1444. "I'll Hang my Harp on a Willow Tree"
 1445. "True Lovers", "High Germany", "The King's Commands"
 1446. "The Carfindo"
 1447. "Fair Susan"
 1448. "Pretty Caroline"
 1449. "Lovely Nancy"
 1450. "Sailor from Sea"
 1451. "Boys of Kilkenny"
 1452. "Darling Boy"
 1453. "Shannon Side"
 1454. "Jack the Sailor"
 1455. "The Shamrock Shore"
 1456. "Three Pretty Maids"
 1457. "Tobacco"
 1458. "The Peeler and the Goat"
 1459. "I Designed to Say No (But Mistook and Said Yes)", "As I was A-Walking by Yon Shady Grove"
 1460. "Jone O'Greenfield's Ramble"
 1461. "On Board of a Ninety-Eight"
 1462. "Saucy Ploughboy"
 1463. "Poor Man's Wish"
 1464. "Bold Robber"
 1465. "Harry the Tailor"
 1466. No record
 1467. No record
 1468. "The Blacksmith"
 1469. "A Lincolnshire Shepherd"
 1470. "Come All You Valiant Shepherds"
 1471. No record
 1472. "Tarry Woo"
 1473. "The Rambling Comber"
 1474. "All in a Row"
 1475. "God Speed the Plough"
 1476. "The New-Fashioned Farmer"
 1477. "The Mare and the Foal"
 1478. "Down the Green Groves", "Jealousy", "Young Maria"
 1479. "At Seventeen Years of Age"
 1480. "Devil's In the Girl"
 1481. "O The Roast Beef of Old England"
 1482. "The Old Man's Advice"
 1483. "I've Lived in Service"
 1484. "Galstonbury Town"
 1485. "The Rest of the Day's Your Own"
 1486. "Gilderoy", "The Curragh of Kildare"
 1487. "Salisbury Plain"
 1488. "Lads of Virginia"
 1489. No record
 1490. "Crockery Ware"
 1491. "The Thrashing Machine"
 1492. "The Ensilver Song"
 1493. "Betsy Watson"
 1494. "Comrades"
 1495. "What a Funny Little Place to Have One"
 1496. "Wheel Yer Perambulator"
 1497. "On a Summer's Night"
 1498. "Flanagan's Band", "Drums Went Bang"
 1499. "Old Shep" (Red Foley and Arthur Williams)
 1500. "Down By the Old Mill Stream"

1501 to 1600
 1501. "The London Prentice Boy"
 1502. "I Likes a Drop of Good Beer"
 1503. "Christians Awake", "Awake Rejoice and Sing", "Egypt"
 1504. "A Sailor in the North Country"
 1505. "My Father Gave Me", "A Bowl, A Bottle, A Dish, And a Ladle"	
 1506. "Cuckoo's Nest" (see also Roud 5407)
 1507. "Come All You Young Ladies and Gentlemen"
 1508. "The Wooden Leg'd Parson"
 1509. No record
 1510. "I'm A Young Man From the Country"
 1511. "The Rotherham Statues"
 1512. "Good English Ale" (see also Roud 2414)
 1513. "Home From the Fair"
 1514. "Benjamin Bowmaneer"
 1515. "The Bell Ringing"
 1516. "Shrove Tuesday Song"
 1517. "The Mallard"
 1518. No record
 1519. "The Keeper and The Doe"	
 1520. "Hal an Tow"	
 1521. "The Diggers' Song"	
 1522. "Lasses Get Your Rakes Ready", "Haytime's Coming"
 1523. "Down in Yon Forest"
 1524. "The Band O' Shearers"
 1525. "Not a Swan on the Lake"
 1526. "It Happened On a Day"
 1527. "The Hash O' Bennagok"
 1528. "The Butcher and the Tailor's Wife"
 1529. "Blackwell Merry Night"
 1530. "Lily"
 1531. "The Rambler from Clare"
 1532. "The Maid and the Magpie"
 1533. "Susan's Adventures in a Man of War"
 1534. "Riding Down to Portsmouth"
 1535. "King Roger"
 1536. "Geordie Gill", "Geordie Fair"
 1537. "Edward Gayden", "Edward Jorgen"
 1538. "Napoleon's Dream"
 1539. "Lovely on the Water"
 1540. "The Trotting Horse"
 1541. "Watercress Girl"
 1542. "The Best Man Here"
 1543. "It Wast Just Against the Cheshire Gate"
 1544. "Duke William's Gamble"
 1545. "The Ploughboy's Dream"
 1546. "'Twas On an April Morning"
 1547. No record
 1548. "The Pelican"
 1549. "Lost Child Found"
 1550. "Good Morning Sir"
 1551. "Righteous Joseph"
 1552. "Nelson's Monument"
 1553. "Daring Highwayman"
 1554. "The Lass of London City"
 1555. "Dear Irish Boy"
 1556. "Jockey and Jenny"
 1557. "The Courtship of Willie and Peggie"
 1558. "As I was A-Walking"
 1559. "Eli Sikes"
 1560. "I'll Gar Our Gudeman Trow"
 1561. "Sorry the Day I Was Married"
 1562. "The Cartmell Hunting Song"
 1563. "Poor Tom", "Who Knocks There", "A Harvest Song"	
 1564. No record
 1565. No record
 1566. "Elwina of Waterloo"
 1567. "The Death of John Lee"
 1568. "The Shooting Gallery"
 1569. "My Love He is a Sailor Boy"
 1570. "Whistle Daughter Whistle", "Whistle Whistle Aul Wife"
 1571. "Bridgwater Fair"
 1572. "Poor Man's Labour"
 1573. "Beggars and Ballad Singers"
 1574. "Bold Nelson's Praise"
 1575. "The Isle of France"
 1576. No record
 1577. No record
 1578. "Swarth Fell Rocks"
 1579. "Robbie and Grannie"
 1580. "James Waller the Poacher"	
 1581. "Once There was a Pretty Maid"
 1582. "Sheep Shearing"
 1583. "The Shannon and Chesapeake"	
 1584. "New Year's Song"	
 1585. No record	
 1586. "Merry Tom of All Trades", "Get Money at Every Deadlift"	
 1587. "The Breeches"	
 1588. "My Wife and Breeches"
 1589. "Be Quick For I'm in Haste"
 1590. No record	
 1591. "Cis and Harry"	
 1592. "Roger and Dolly"
 1593. "The Maiden's Complaint"	
 1594. "The Little Carpenter"	
 1595. "Lumps of Pudding"	
 1596. "The Clown's Courtship"	
 1597. "Harvest Song"	
 1598. "Old Astrologer"	
 1599. "A Child's Calendar"	
 1600. "Collin's Ghost"

1601 to 1700

 1601. "The Comfort of Man"
 1602. "I Don't Think Much of You"
 1603. "The Farmer's Toast", "The Jolly Farmer"
 1604. No record
 1605. "My Charming Molly O"
 1606. "Nelly was a Milkmaid"
 1607. "Nothing At All"
 1608. "Serious Tom"
 1609. No record
 1610. "The Tailor's Breeches"
 1611. "Young Susan Had Lovers"
 1612. "Sweet Swansea"
 1613. "The Trooper Watering His Nag"
 1614. "I'll Go and Enlist for a Sailor"
 1615. "The Christmas Suckling Pig", "The Sussex Pig"
 1616. "There's Bound to Be a Row"
 1617. "Will Watch"
 1618. "Young Henry of the Raging Main"
 1619. "Green Linnet"
 1620. "Giles Scroggins' Ghost"
 1621. "Robin Hood and the Curtal Friar" (Child 123)
 1622. No record
 1623. "Buy Broom Besoms"
 1624. "The Crafty Maid"
 1625. "Kelly the Pirate"
 1626. "(My Name's) Napoleon Bonaparte", "Napoleon's Farewell to Paris"
 1627. "Duncan Campbell"
 1628. "The Squire and the Gipsey Girl"
 1629. "The Poor Irish Stranger"
 1630. "Stark Naked Robbery"
 1631. "The Bedmaking"
 1632. "The Old Miser", "Better for Maids to Live Single"
 1633. "Bonny Kate"
 1634. "Hark Away", "Bright Phoebus"
 1635. "Buttercup Joe"
 1636. No record
 1637. No record
 1638. "The Sailor's Frolic"
 1639. "The Gay Ploughboy"
 1640. "Quite Politely"
 1641. "John White"
 1642. "Down in Yon Meadows"
 1643. "Fare Thee Well Cold Winter", "Long Looked for Come at Last"
 1644. "Low Down in the Broom"
 1645. "The Leaboy's Lassie"
 1646. "Beautiful Nancy"
 1647. "I'm a Damsel so Blooming and Gay", "Oh How I Long to Get Married"
 1648. "Old Woman's Song"
 1649. "The Roving Bachelor", "As Came Ower Yon High High Hill"
 1650. "Seven Months I've Been Married"
 1651. "Beautiful Damsel"
 1652. "Three Jolly Sneaksmen"
 1653. "Watercresses"
 1654. "Avington Pond"
 1655. "The Deserter"
 1656. "Bonny Black Hare"
 1657. "My Master's Gun"
 1658. "The Cattistock Hunting Song", "Dream of Napoleon", "The Old Bitch Fox"
 1659. "The Factory Girl"
 1660. "Lord Paget"
 1661. "The Drinker", "The Merry Tippler"
 1662. No record
 1663. "The Pensioner's Complaint"
 1664. "Poor Jolly Sailor Lads", "Come All You Pretty Fair Maids"
 1665. "Portsmouth City"
 1666. "Roger and Nell", "Old Berkshire Song"
 1667. "The Brisk Lad", "The Sheepstealer"
 1668. "Three Oxford Scholars"
 1669. "Time to Be Made a Wife"
 1670. No record
 1671. "The Apprentice Sailor"
 1672. "Billy and Sally"
 1673. No record
 1674. "Captain Avery", "The Linnet"
 1675. "The Brisk Young Sailor Bold"
 1676. "Colin and His Cow"
 1677. "Come Come My Friends"
 1678. "The Drum Major"
 1679. "Tailor in a Hobble"
 1680. "I Never Says Nothing to Nobody"
 1681. "Joe the Marine"
 1682. "Johnny and Molly"
 1683. "The Lovely Milkmaid"
 1684. "The Maid's Lament"
 1685. "The Newfoundland Sailor"
 1686. "The Bold Poachers", "The Oakham Poachers"
 1687. "Paddy Backwards"
 1688. "The Ploughboy and the Cockney"
 1689. No record
 1690. "Poacher's Song", "Three Hearty Young Poachers"
 1691. "The Wandering Girl"
 1692. "Week's Matrimony"
 1693. "When My Old Hat Was New"
 1694. "An Old Woman Clothed in Grey"
 1695. "Captain Coulston"
 1696. "The Devil and Little Mike"
 1697. "The Holy Well"
 1698. "Rakes of Kildare"
 1699. "Gallant Female Sailor"
 1700. "The Bloody Gardener"

1701 to 1800
 1701. "James and Flora"
 1702. "Constant Johnny"
 1703. "Adieu to Old England", "Once I Had a Featherbed"
 1704. "Matthew Mark Luke and John", "My Coffin Shall Be Black"
 1705. "In Bodmin Town"
 1706. "Speculation", "The Lofty Giant"
 1707. "The Plowboys' Song"
 1708. "I Wish There Was No Prison"
 1709. "The Irish Hop-Pole Puller"
 1710. "Three Jolly Boy"
 1711. "Adventures of Little Mike"
 1712. "Down By the Seaside"
 1713. "The Pear Tree"
 1714. "Come All You Young Lovers", "The Rich Lady Gay"
 1715. "Hopping Down in Kent"
 1716. "The Colour of Amber"
 1717. "A Woman's Work is Never Done"
 1718. "Llandaff"
 1719. "It's of a Young Soldier"
 1720. "Young Collins"
 1721. "Abroad as I was Walking"
 1722. "Six Joyful Welchmen"
 1723. "Pretty Betsy of Deptford"
 1724. "Our General Bold Captain"
 1725. "No record"
 1726. "A Warning To Deserters", "Stinton the Deserter"
 1727. "The Cobbler and the Miser"
 1728. "Banks of the Clyde"
 1729. "Hartlake Bridge"
 1730. "Awa' Birds Away", "Bird Tenting Song", "Car-Whoo Car-Whoo"
 1731. "A Man that is Stout and Bold"
 1732. "Atching Tan Song"
 1733. "The Broomdasher"
 1734. "The Freckless Young Girl", "Taking an Evening's Walk"
 1735. "The Gloucester Blinder", "Muddley Barracks"
 1736. "Down in the Fields Where the Buttercups All Grow"
 1737. "Little Pigs", "The Old Sow"
 1738. "Jolly Jarge"
 1739. "The Dockyard Gate"
 1740. "Good Old Jeff"
 1741. "Why Can't it Always Be Saturday"
 1742. "Seaweed"
 1743. "Cottage By the Sea"
 1744. "Farmer Giles"
 1745. "Reason Why"
 1746. "The Hungry Army"
 1747. "Cod Banging"
 1748. "No record"
 1749. "Miner's Dream of Home"
 1750. "No record"
 1751. "The Dear Little Maiden"
 1752. "A Country Life"
 1753. "White Wings"
 1754. "Handy Man"
 1755. "Little Sweetheart In the Spring"
 1756. "A Boy's Best Friend is His Mother"
 1757. "Maggie May"
 1758. "Among My Souvenirs"
 1759. "Rufford Park Poachers"
 1760. "John Bowlin'"
 1761. "Landlord and Tenant"
 1762. "Owd Yowe Wi' One Horn, T'"
 1763. "Song of the Thrush"
 1764. "Gypsy's Warning"
 1765. "No record"
 1766. "No record"
 1767. "Polly's Father Lived in Lincolnshire"
 1768. "Rolling on the Grass"
 1769. "Merry Mountain Child"
 1770. "The Powder Monkey"
 1771. "The Muffin Man"
 1772. "Farmer's Dog"
 1773. "No record"
 1774. "Hold the Fort"
 1775. "Come Little Leaves"
 1776. "Jemima Brown"
 1777. "Oh Joe the Boat's Going Over"
 1778. "Ten Thousand Miles Away"
 1779. "What Will Become of England?"
 1780. "Firelock Stile"
 1781. "Barton Broad Babbing Ballad"
 1782. "Marshfield Mummers Song", "St. Stephen's Day"
 1783. "Two Sweethearts", "A Group of Young Squaddies"
 1784. "Banks of the Clyde", "The Lad in the Scotch Brigade"
 1785. "Jolly Jack the Sailor Lad"
 1786. "Rap Her to Bank"
 1787. "The Loss of the London"
 1788. "The Smacksman"
 1789. "Now is the Time for Fishing"
 1790. "Robin Hood's Progress to Nottingham" (Child 139)
 1791. "Annie"
 1792. "Jocky Said to Jenny"
 1793. "Jack the Sailor"
 1794. "Jack Robinson"
 1795. "I Waited Out My Hours", "I've Rambled This Country Both Early and Late"
 1796. "Rose of Britain's Isle"
 1797. "When I Was a Young Man"
 1798. "Chanty Song (So It's Pass...)"
 1799. "Soon We'll Be in England Town"
 1800. "Bold McCarthy"

1801 to 1900
 1801. "The Emigrant's Farewell", "Bellingham", "Good Friends and Companions"
 1802. "The Flying Cloud"
 1803. "England's Great Loss By a Storm of Wind" (Laws K2)
 1804. "The Drummer Boy of Waterloo" (Laws J1)
 1805. "Erin Far Away" (Laws J6)
 1806. "Casey's Whiskey" (Laws dH51)
 1807. "Jessie Munro" (Laws P40)
 1808. "The Jug of Punch"
 1809. "American Woods" (Laws M36)
 1810. "As Now We Are Sailing"
 1811. "Citadel Hill"
 1812. "The Banks of Newfoundland" (Laws K25)
 1813. No record
 1814. "Brigantine Sirocco"
 1815. "Canso Strait" (Laws dD52)
 1816. "Captain Conrod" (Laws dD51)
 1817. "George Jones" (Laws D20)
 1818. "Saladin's Crew" (Laws dD45)
 1819. No record
 1820. "Dutchman's Song"
 1821. "The Flemings from Torbay" (Laws D23)
 1822. "The Ghostly Sailors" (Laws D16)
 1823. "Burning of the Granite Mill" (Laws G13)
 1824. "Guysboro Song" (Laws dD48)
 1825. "Moosehead Lake"
 1826. "Joe Livermore"
 1827. "Jolly Fisherman" (Laws dD47)
 1828. "Lukey's Boat", "Loakie's Boat"
 1829. "Loss of the Philosophy" (Laws dD49)
 1830. "Louisiana Lowlands"
 1831. "The Mary L. McKay" (Laws dD50)
 1832. "McCarthy's Song" (Laws dH52)
 1833. "McNab's Island"
 1834. "Meagher's Children" (Laws G25)
 1835. "Ocean Queen"
 1836. "The Lakes of Pontchartrain" (Laws H9)
 1837. "Young Millman", "Prince Edward Island Murder" (Laws dF59)
 1838. "Sable Island Song"
 1839. "Sable Island Song" (accidental repeat)
 1840. "The Seizure of the E.A. Horton" (Laws D28)
 1841. "Song of the Tangier Gold Mines"
 1842. No record
 1843. "Twas In the Town of Parsboro" (Laws dH44)
 1844. "Unicorn" (Laws dD46)
 1845. "Tacking a Full Rigged Ship Off Shore"
 1846. "The Indian's Lament"
 1847. "Out With My Gun in the Morning", "The Contented Countryman"
 1848. "The Fella Who Played the Trombone"
 1849. "The Parson's Creed"
 1850. "The Chinaman With the Monkey Nose"
 1851. "Stormy Weather Boys"
 1852. "The Candlelight Fisherman"
 1853. "The Oily Rig"
 1854. "The Fish and Chip Ship", "While Going Around the Cape", "I Am an Ancient Mariner"
 1855. "The Collier Brig", "The Worst Old Ship"
 1856. No record
 1857. "Old Johnny Braddlem"
 1858. "Joe Bowman"
 1859. "The Horn Of The Hunter"
 1860. "The Ullswater Pack", "Pass the Jug Around"
 1861. "The Hunting Priest", "Tally Ho the Hounds", "Doctor Mack"
 1862. "Drink Puppy Drink"
 1863. "The Birds Upon the Tree"
 1864. "The Welton Hunt"
 1865. "The Lish Young Buy-a-broom"
 1866. "My Uncle Pete"
 1867. "Corby Castle"
 1868. "Reynard the Fox"
 1869. "Wharncliffe Highwood", "Rural Sport"
 1870. No record
 1871. "On A Fine Hunting Morn"
 1872. "Maids of Australia"
 1873. "The Scent Was Good"
 1874. "Tramps and Hawkers"
 1875. "Nicky Tams"
 1876. "The Moss O' Burreldale"
 1877. "The Fattest Man in the Forty-Twa"
 1878. "Jimmy Macelbee"
 1879. "Jimmy Run Down to Your Uncle"
 1880. "The Ring Dang Doo"
 1881. "The Game of Football"
 1882. "Bobbin Winder's Song"
 1883. "The Dodgey Putter"
 1884. "Morrissey and the Black" (Laws H19)
 1885. "The Chapeau Boys"
 1886. "Lady of the Lake"
 1887. "The Half-Hitch", "The Old Shoe" (Laws N23)
 1888. "The Blaeberries" (Laws N19)
 1889. "The Lady Leroy" (Laws N5)
 1890. "When the Battle it Was Won" (Laws J23)
 1891. "The Chesapeake and Shannon" (Laws J21)
 1892. "Nelson's Victory" (Laws J48)
 1893. "Burke's Dream" (Laws J16)
 1894. "The Blind Sailor", "Cork Harbour" (Laws K6)
 1895. No record
 1896. "Susan Strayed the Briny Beach" (Laws K19)
 1897. "The Flying Dutchman" (Laws K23)
 1898. "The Merman", "The Maid With a Tail" (Laws K24)
 1899. "Bold Daniel" (Laws K34)
 1900. "Captain Kidd" (Laws K35)

1901 to 2000 
 1901. "My Ducksie Has Fled", "Gold Watch" (Laws K41)
 1902. "Ye Landsmen and Ye Seamen Bold", "Sailor's Hornpipe" (Laws K42)
 1903. "Jack Sheppard" (Laws L6) 
 1904. "My Bonny Black Bess" (Laws L8)
 1905. "Transported for Mail Robbery", "A Prisoner For Life" (Laws L15)
 1906. "Jack Williams" (Laws L17)
 1907. "I Am a Wild Young Irish Boy" (Laws L19)
 1908. No record
 1909. "Duffy's Farewell" (Laws M5)
 1910. "Forty Years Ago"
 1911. "Pretty Betsey", "It's of a Young Damsel in Crewkerne Did Dwell", "The Young Scotchman of Dover" (Laws M18)
 1912. No record
 1913. "Lovely Willie" (Laws M35)
 1914. "Sir Niel and MacVan", "Glengyle" (Laws M39)
 1915. "On the First of November", "Bold Alexander" (Laws N1)
 1916. "Wild Americay" (Laws O19)
 1917. "The Soldier Boy" (Laws O31)
 1918. "Courting Too Slow" (Laws P5)
 1919. "Pat O'Brien" (Laws P39)
 1920. "The Romish Lady" (Laws Q32)
 1921. "Waterloo" (Laws J2)
 1922. "The Plains O' Waterloo" (Laws J3)
 1923. "The Battle of Waterloo" (Laws J3)
 1924. "As I Roved Out Through Irishtown", "The Crimean War" (Laws J9)
 1925. "The Banks of Gaspeareaux" (Laws C26)
 1926. "Turner's Camp" (Laws C23)
 1927. "The Dam on Baldwin Creek" (Laws C21)
 1928. "Driving Logs on the Cass" (Laws C22)
 1929. "Utah Carroll" (Laws B4) 
 1930. "Little Joe the Wrangler" (Laws B5)
 1931. "Perished in the Snow" (Laws G32)
 1932. "Murdered By A Brother" (Laws F12)
 1933. "Lula Vares" (Laws F10)
 1934. "Revolutionary Tea" (Laws A24)
 1935. "The Murder of Laura Foster" (Laws F36)
 1936. No record
 1937. "The Dying Hobo" (Laws H3)
 1938. "The Chippewa Stream" (Laws H10)
 1939. "Stratton Mountain Tragedy" (Laws G18)
 1940. "Floyd Collins" (Laws G22)
 1941. "Jamie Foyers"
 1942. "The Winter of Seventy-Three"
 1943. "Napoleon Bonaparte"
 1944. "Rocky Brook", "Samuel Allen" (Laws C10)
 1945. "The Camp on McNeil"
 1946. "The Napan Heroes"
 1947. "The Ploughboy"
 1948. "Joe Brook"
 1949. "Arthur Curtis's Horse"
 1950. "The Merner Song"
 1951. "If You'll Only Let Whiskey Alone"
 1952. "Anything"
 1953. No record
 1954. "The Months of the Year"
 1955. "Good Old State of Maine"
 1956. No record
 1957. "Sarah's Young Man"
 1958. "Pulling Hard Against the Stream"
 1959. "The Cedar Grove" (Laws D18)
 1960. "The Irish Patriot"
 1961. "Duffy's Hotel"
 1962. "The Demon of the Sea"
 1963. "The Plain Golden Band" (Laws H17)
 1964. "The Belles of Renous"
 1965. "The Glen Alone"
 1966. "The Unknown Log Rider"
 1967. "The Last Letter"
 1968. "Guy Reed" (Laws C6)
 1969. "McLellan's Son" (Laws dG43)
 1970. "The Banks of Brandywine" (Laws H28)
 1971. No record
 1972. "Banks of Newfoundland"
 1973. "The Shooting Star"
 1974. "The Wreck of the Lady Sherbrooke"
 1975. No record
 1976. "The Bounty Jumper"
 1977. "Our Fifer Boy"
 1978. "Rose of Tralee"
 1979. "The Burial of Sir John Moore"
 1980. "A Hundred Years Ago"
 1981. "Live and Let Live"
 1982. "The Moon is Up"
 1983. "Jack's Come Home Today"
 1984. "Tom Bowling"
 1985. "Humphrey Hough"
 1986. "Two Orphan Boys"
 1987. "We Britons to Arms"
 1988. "Blann's Beer"
 1989. "Bright Phoebe"
 1990. "Behind the Green Bush"
 1991. "County Tyrone", "Jane of Tyrone"
 1992. "Bonaparte"
 1993. "I Had a Handsome Fortune"
 1994. "Logie O'Buchan"
 1995. "A New Song"
 1996. "The First Time I Saw My Love", "The Generous Lover"
 1997. "The Coast of Peru" (Laws D26)
 1998. "A Fitting Out"
 1999. "The Cruise of the Dove"
 2000. "The Bitter Whaling Ground"

2001 to 2100 
 2001. "The Whalers' Song"
 2002. "A Whaling Scene"
 2003. "Our Old Friend Coffin"
 2004. "The Wounded Whale"
 2005. "Rolling Down to Old Maui"
 2006. "Diego's Bold Shore"
 2007. "The Old Hulk"
 2008. "The Bark Gay Head"
 2009. "The Bark Ocean Rover"
 2010. "Desolation"
 2011. "The Wings of a Goney"
 2012. "Blow Ye Winds"
 2013. No record
 2014. "A Wet Sheet and a Flowing Sea"
 2015. "Sling the Flowing Bowl"
 2016. "Come Loose Every Sail to the Breeze"
 2017. "The Topsail Shivers in the Wind"
 2018. "Will Watch (Sequel To)"
 2019. "The Sea"
 2020. "Saturday Night at Sea"
 2021. "I Was Once a Sailor"
 2022. "Sailors' Come All Ye", "Heart of Gold"
 2023. "The Can of Grog"
 2024. "Pirate of the Isles"
 2025. "The Cornish Pirate"
 2026. "Most Beautiful"
 2027. "The Sea Ran High"
 2028. "The Ocean Queen"
 2029. "The Storm Was Loud"
 2030. "Neptune", "The Ocean King"
 2031. "The Dauntless Sailor"
 2032. "The Sovereign of the Sea"
 2033. "Life on the Ocean Wave"
 2034. "A Young Virgin"
 2035. "The Surpriz'd Nymph", "The Swimming Lady", "A Wanton Discovery"
 2036. "I Would that the Wars Were All Over"
 2037. "Paddy Stole the Rope"
 2038. "William Rufus"
 2039. "Women Love Kissing as Well as the Men"
 2040. "The Times"
 2041. "The Heathen Dear", "My Name is Santa Claus"
 2042. "The Moon is Brightly Beaming Love"
 2043. "Shearing Day"
 2044. "Sarah Maria Cornell"
 2045. "The Banks of Schuykill"
 2046. "The Banks of Champlain"
 2047. "A New Liberty Song"
 2048. "A Song on the Nantucket Ladies", "Round Cape Horn"
 2049. "Blessed Land of Love and Liberty"
 2050. "Sons of Worth"
 2051. "John Bull's Epistle"
 2052. "Ho for California"
 2053. "The Captain"
 2054. "The Confession"
 2055. "The Indian Hunter"
 2056. "Willie Gray"
 2057. "Willie's on the Dark Blue Sea"
 2058. "Banks of Banna", "Anna"
 2059. "The Maid of Erin"
 2060. "Adieu My Native Land"
 2061. "The Angel's Whisper"
 2062. "The Bride's Farewell"
 2063. "The Dying Soldier"
 2064. "The Ocean"
 2065. "Thou Hast Learned to Love Another"
 2066. "We Met"
 2067. "Jamie's on the Stormy Sea"
 2068. "Adieu to Erin"
 2069. "Blow High Blow Low"
 2070. "The Beacon Light"
 2071. "Virtuous America"
 2072. "A New Sea Song"
 2073. "Hunter's Lane"
 2074. "Fare You Well"
 2075. "A Scots Sang", "I Lost my Love and I Carena"
 2076. "When I Remember"
 2077. "Come Let Us Be Jolly"
 2078. "Ye Parliament of England"
 2079. "An Ancient Riddle"
 2080. "Wait for the Wagon"
 2081. "Prayer"
 2082. "The Pilot"
 2083. "The Lord Our God"
 2084. "Row On"
 2085. "The Recruiting Sargent"
 2086. "The Post Below"
 2087. "A Love Song in the Year 1769"
 2088. "Elegy on the Death of a Mad Dog"
 2089. "A Charming Fellow"
 2090. "The Wreath"
 2091. "I Cannot Call Her Mother"
 2092. "Village Born Beauty"
 2093. "As I Grow Old"
 2094. "Barney McCoy"
 2095. "Thomas Farewell", "The Sailor's Farewell"
 2096. "Terrible Polly"
 2097. "The Wide World of Waters"
 2098. No record
 2099. "The Keyhole in the Door"
 2100. "The Sandshark"

2101 to 2200 

 2101. "Billy O'Roorke"
 2102. "Witty Shepherd"
 2103. "Jordan"
 2104. "Cupid's Charms"
 2105. "Did You See My Lad", "Bonny Bonny Lad"
 2106. "A Tar's Song", "The Sailor's Meeting"
 2107. "Sary Syke"
 2108. "Sally is the Girl for Me"
 2109. "The Truth Sent from Above"
 2110. "The Man that Lives Must Learn to Die", "On Life and Death"
 2111. "Awake Awake Sweet England"
 2112. "Christ Made a Trance", "The Moon Shines Bright"
 2113. "Twelve Apostles", "When Jesus Christ Had Lived"
 2114. "The Birth of the Saviour"
 2115. "A Most Excellent Ballad of Joseph the Carpenter", "Marye and Joseph"
 2116. "Savior's Love"
 2117. "The Iron Peel"
 2118. "Poor Jenny Sits-a-Weeping"
 2119. "Christ is Born of a Maiden Fair"
 2120. "The Little Room"
 2121. "Green Grow the Leaves"
 2122. "Easter Snow"
 2123. "Greenwood Laddie"
 2124. "The Mountain Streams", "Wi' My Dog and Gun"
 2125. "Yon Green Valley"
 2126. "The Long Peg and Awl"
 2127. "The Magpie's Nest"
 2128. "She Was a Rum One"
 2129. "Baldheaded End of the Broom", "Love", "Boys Take Care"
 2130. "The Deserted Husband"
 2131. "The One Thing or the Other"
 2132. "The Joyful Widower"
 2133. "The Doffin Mistress"
 2134. "Hot Ashfelt"
 2135. "Father's Old Coat", "Pee Wee Jockie Clark"
 2136. "The Barnyards of Delgaty"
 2137. "Mucking O' Geordie's Byre"
 2138. "The Roving Ploughboy"
 2139. "Tommy Suet's Ball"
 2140. "The Ewie wi' the Crooked Horn"
 2141. "Hey John Barleycorn"
 2142. "The Day We Went to Rothesay-o"
 2143. "On Ilkla Moor Baht 'at"
 2144. "Did You Ever See"
 2145. "The Wild Man of Borneo"
 2146. "The Black Velvet Band"
 2147. "The Black Velvet Band"
 2148. "Heenan and Sayers"
 2149. "The Knickerbocker Line"
 2150. "Morrissey and the Russian"
 2151. "The Standing Stones"
 2152. "Sweet Fanny Adams"
 2153. "The Beggar Wench"
 2154. "The Berryfields of Blair"
 2155. "Bogie's Bonnie Belle"
 2156. "Casro Manishi-o"
 2157. "Big Jimmy Drummond", "The Choring Song"
 2158. "Hush Little Babbie"
 2159. "I Binged Avree"
 2160. "McPherson's Farewell" (Robert Burns)
 2161. "Me Brother's 'Orse"
 2162. "That Tattie Liftin'"
 2163. "The Traveling Candyman"
 2164. "Johnnie Sangster"
 2165. "Lothian Hairst"
 2166. "Ellon Fair"
 2167. "The Hairst"
 2168. "Irish Molly O"
 2169. "Rosie Anderson"
 2170. "The Bonny Lad that Handles the Plough"
 2171. "Mormond Braes"
 2172. "The Bonnie Ship the Diamond"
 2173. "It Fell About a Martinmas Time"
 2174. "The Rocks of Gibraltar"
 2175. "Broomhill's Bonny Dochter"
 2176. "The Barns of Beneuchies"
 2177. "A Shillin or Twa"
 2178. "A Shillin or Twa"
 2179. "Ellen of Aberdeen"
 2180. "Drumdelgie"
 2181. "The Weary Farmers"
 2182. "The Battle of Barrossa"
 2183. "The Highland Maid"
 2184. "The Day of Waterloo"
 2185. "Enniskillen Dragoon"
 2186. "Welcome Table"
 2187. "Fellow that Looks Like Me" (Laws H21)
 2188. "The Warrantee Deed" (Laws H24)
 2189. "The Girl With the Waterfall" (Laws H26)
 2190. "Ten Broeck and Mollie" (Laws H26)
 2191. "The Blooming Bright Star of Belle Isle" (Laws H29)
 2192. "Jerry Go Oil That Car" (Laws H30)
 2193. "Christine Leroy" (Laws H31)
 2194. "Tittery Nan" (Laws H16)
 2195. "The Dunville Girl" (Laws H14)
 2196. "On the Banks of the Pembina" (Laws H11)
 2197. "The Hard-Working Miner" (Laws G33)
 2198. "The Chatsworth Wreck" (Laws G30)
 2199. "The Battle of Shiloh" (Laws A10)
 2200. "The Battle on Shiloh's Hill" (Laws A11)

2201 to 2300 
 2201. "The Pea Ridge Battle" (Laws A12)
 2202. "Manassa Junction", "Battle of Bull Run" (Laws A9)
 2203. No record
 2204. "James Bird" (Laws A5)
 2205. "James Bird's Farewell" (Laws A5)
 2206. "A Soldier from Missouri", "Along the Kansas Line" (Laws A16)
 2207. "War Song" (Laws A19)
 2208. "Hiram Hubbard" (Laws A20)
 2209. "Bold Dighton" (Laws A21)
 2210. "Come All You Bold Canadians" (Laws A22)
 2211. "The Hunters of Kentucky" (Laws A25)
 2212. "Pearl Bryan" (Laws F2)
 2213. "The Fort Thomas Murder" (Laws F3)
 2214. No record
 2215. "Jim Fisk" (Laws F18)
 2216. "The Vance Song" (Laws F17)
 2217. "Harry Bale" (Laws C13)
 2218. "The Death of Harry Bradford" (Laws C12)
 2219. "Shantyboy on the Big Eau Plaine" (Laws C11)
 2220. "Lost Jimmie Whalen" (Laws C8)
 2221. "Tebo" (Laws C6)
 2222. "John Roberts" (Laws C3)
 2223. "John Singleton" (Laws C15)
 2224. "Sam Bass", "The Little Brown Bulls" (Laws C16)
 2225. "The Three McFarlands" (Laws C18)
 2226. "Blue Mountain Lake" (Laws C20)
 2227. "Bold Northwestman" (Laws D1)
 2228. "The Loss of the Albion" (Laws D2)
 2229. "Fifteen Ships on George's Banks" (Laws D3)
 2230. "The Persian's Crew" (Laws D4)
 2231. "The Death of William Dilley" (Laws D5)
 2232. "The Death of Herbert Rice" (Laws D6)
 2233. "Red Iron Ore" (Laws D9)
 2234. "The Dream of the Miner's Child" (Laws D10)
 2235. "The Eastern Light" (Laws D11)
 2236. "The Dom Pedro" (Laws D12)
 2237. "The Maids of Simcoe", "The Schooner Fred Dunbar" (Laws D14)
 2238. "The Beaver Island Boys" (Laws D17)
 2239. "The Wreck of the Huron" (Laws D21)
 2240. "Jesse James"
 2241. "Jesse James" (Laws E2)
 2242. "A Missouri Ballad" (Laws dE44)
 2243. "Cole Younger"
 2244. "Sam Bass" (Laws E4)
 2245. "Claud Allen"
 2246. "Wild Bill Jones" (Laws E10)
 2247. "Wilkes Lovell" (Laws E9)
 2248. "Twenty-One Years" (Laws E16)
 2249. "Zen Turner's Gal" (Laws E18)
 2250. "Harvey Logan" (Laws E21)
 2251. "Mary's Complaint"
 2252. No record
 2253. "Frank Dupree" (Laws E24)
 2254. "Muff Lawler the Squealer" (Laws E25)
 2255. "J.R. Birchall" (Laws E26)
 2256. "The Murder of Grace Brown" (Laws F7)
 2257. "The Brookfield Murder" (Laws F8)
 2258. "Munro's Confession", "The Murder of Sarah Vail" (Laws F9)
 2259. "Josie Langmaid" (Laws F21)
 2260. "Poor Goins" (Laws F22)
 2261. "John Funston" (Laws F23)
 2262. "The Peddler and His Wife" (Laws F24)
 2263. "The Ashland Tragedy" (Laws F25)
 2264. "The Birchall Murder" (Laws F26)
 2265. No record
 2266. "The Meeks Murder" (Laws F28)
 2267. "The Midnight Murder of the Meeks Family" (Laws F29)
 2268. "Little Nellie Meeks" (Laws F30)
 2269. "The Meeks Family" (Laws dF49)
 2270. "Nellie's Lament" (Laws dF50)
 2271. "Bejamin Deane" (Laws F32)
 2272. "Death of Emma Hartzell" (Laws F34)
 2273. "Stella Kenny" (Laws F37)
 2274. "Sir James the Rose" (Child 213)
 2275. "Early Monday Morning"
 2276. "A Bonny Ca' Laddie For Me"
 2277. No record
 2278. "On Board the Victory"
 2279. "Richard and I"
 2280. "Peggy Gordon"
 2281. "Crookit Bawbee"
 2282. "Sweet Letty Lee"
 2283. "The Dying Californian"
 2284. "Henry and Mary Ann"
 2285. "What Harm Has Jesus Done"
 2286. "Climbing Jacob's Ladder"
 2287. "The Shamrock Shore"
 2288. "Free And Easy to Jog Along"
 2289. "The Good Ship Cambria"
 2290. "The Green Fields of Canada"
 2291. "Finvola the Gem of the Roe"
 2292. "The Faughan Shore"
 2293. "There Waur a Farmer's Dochter"
 2294. "Down By the Canal"
 2295. "The Wilderness Lady"
 2296. "The Spanish Main"
 2297. No record
 2298. "The Cruel Father and Constant Lover"
 2299. "Young M'Tyre"
 2300. "The Road to Dundee"

2301 to 2400 

 2301. "Diana and Her Sailor Bright"
 2302. "O Hard Fortune", "The Little Drummer"
 2304. "The Discharged Drummer"
 2305. "The Maiden's Lament"
 2306. "She's Like the Swallow"
 2307. "The Morning Dew"
 2308. No record
 2309. "Cruiskeen Lawn"
 2310. "Three Jolly Jack Tars", "The Black Cook", "The Docter Outwitted By the Black"
 2311. "The Weaver"
 2312. "Skibbereen"
 2313. "Daniel O'Connell"
 2314. "By the Hush Me Boys"
 2315. "Johnny Cope"
 2316. "Young Munro"
 2317. "Farewell to Funery"
 2318. "The Jolly Raftsman O"
 2319. "The Spree", "The Jolly Irishman"
 2320. "The Twelfth of July"
 2321. "Drink Round Brave Boys", "The Faggot Cutter"
 2322. "Borland's Groves"
 2323. "Sir Charles Lapier"
 2324. "The Soo St. Mary's Jail" (Laws dE51)
 2325. "Save Your Money When You're Young"
 2326. "The Indian Lass"
 2327. "Taking Gear in the Night"
 2328. "Goodbye Susan Jane"
 2329. "Groyle Machree"
 2330. "Bonny Laddie Highland Laddie"
 2331. "Jock Hawk"
 2332. "The Ledbury Clergyman"
 2333. "Inside a Whitewashed Hospital"
 2334. "The Dream of a Miner's Child"
 2335. "The Maid and the Palmer", "The Well Below the Valley" (Child 21)
 2336. "Mistletoe Bough"
 2337. "Lambton Worm" (See also Roud 3504)
 2338. "Robin Hood and the Bishop of Hereford" (Child 144)
 2339. "Heather Johnny"
 2340. "A Woman's Work is Never Done"
 2341. "In Rockley Firs"
 2342. "Private Still"
 2343. "The Gauger"
 2344. "Oh Love it is a Killing Thing"
 2345. "Nancy Pride of the East"
 2346. "The Quarry Bank Mashers"
 2347. "Mrs. Dyer the Baby Farmer"
 2348. "The Priest and the Rake"
 2349. "Reynard the Fox"
 2350. "The Summer Comes and the Grass is Green"
 2351. "Captain Bold Freney"
 2352. "The First Time I Came to the County Limerick"
 2353. "True Lovers' Departure"
 2354. "I Wish I Had the Shepherd's Lamb", "Molly From Her Father"
 2355. "Arthur McBride"
 2356. "Boolavogue"
 2357. "Ye Sons of Old Ireland"
 2358. No record
 2359. "A Chushla Gal Mochree: Thou Fair Pulse of My Heart"
 2360. "The English Courtship", "Drecharian O'Machree"
 2361. "North Country Maid"
 2362. "The Boys of Mullabaun"
 2363. "Drinane Dhu"
 2364. "Castle Hyde"
 2365. "Charming Colleen Ruadh"
 2366. "The Cottage Maid"
 2367. No record
 2368. "Each Night When I Slumber"
 2369. "My Mind it is Uneasy"
 2370. "Handsome Sally"
 2371. "Sweet Cootehill Town"
 2372. "Oh Come With Me My Irish Girl"
 2373. "Captain Thompson"
 2374. "Bishop Butler of Kilcash"
 2375. "Royal Blackbird"
 2376. "Billy Byrne of Ballymanus"
 2377. "McKenna's Dream"
 2378. "The Pound of Tow"
 2379. "Felix"
 2380. "The Blackbird and the Thrush"
 2381. "The Scolding Wife"
 2382. "Finikin Lasses"
 2383. No record
 2384. No record
 2385. "Moreen O'Kelly"
 2386. "My Mama Did Kill Me"
 2387. "Dainty Davie"
 2388. "Dainty Davie Was a Lad"
 2389. "'Twas in the End of King James's Street"
 2390. "Long Time I've Courted You Miss"
 2391. "The Pearl of Th' Irish Nation", "If Any of Those Children of Hunger Shall Cry"
 2392. "Ye Natives of this Nation"
 2393. "Cork and Sweet Munster"
 2394. "The Orangeman"
 2395. "The Lamentation of Hugh Reynolds"
 2396. "She's the Dear Maid to Me"
 2397. No record
 2398. "Father Stole the Parson's Sheep", "The Lovely Irish Boy"
 2399. "You Bachelors You Know"
 2400. "Kitty Will You Marry Me"

2401 to 2500 
 2401. "Spla-Foot Nance"
 2402. "The Real Irish Toper"
 2403. "Tyne of Harrow"
 2404. "Quare Bungle Rye"
 2405. "Kelly's Lamentation", "My Parents and I Could Never Agree"
 2406. "A Sweet Country Life"
 2407. "O Once I Was a Shepherd Boy"
 2408. "The Carter"
 2409. "Twankydillo"
 2410. "Sheep Stealer"
 2411. "Bold Robinson", "The Two Champions"
 2412. "Kitty Maggs and Jolter Giles"
 2413. "My Meatless Day"
 2414. "Good English Ale" (see also Roud 1512)
 2415. "The Norton Fitzwarren Railway Disaster"
 2416. "Peter the Miller"
 2417. "A Jolly Farmer's Boy Be I"
 2418. "I Wandered by the Brookside"
 2419. "Deeds of Napoleon"
 2420. No record
 2421. "The Cobbler and the Goose"
 2422. "Five Cripples"
 2423. "As I Was Walking O'er Little Moorfields"
 2424. No record
 2425. "The Tooting Murder"
 2426. "Money"
 2427. "Ipswich Poaching Song"
 2428. "The Holy Day"
 2429. "The Black Decree"
 2430. "Sons of Levi"
 2431. "Sinner's Redemption"
 2432. "Ratcliffe Highway"
 2433. No record
 2434. "The Yarmouth Fishermens' Song"
 2435. No record
 2436. "Lochnagar"
 2437. "Acquittal of Thomas Haloran"
 2438. "A Brisk Young Widow"
 2439. "Dance To Your Daddy"
 2440. No record
 2441. "As I Was Going Over London Bridge", "Old Woman Lame and Blind"
 2442. No record
 2443. "Baskets and Chairs"
 2444. "Young Lambs to Sell"
 2445. "Arise and Pick a Posy"
 2446. "Sing to Me Johnny"
 2447. "Three Little Tailors"
 2448. "'Twas in the Month of August"
 2449. "The Hermit", "The Shepherd Tuned His Pipe"
 2450. "Sweetly William"
 2451. "Come Give Me a Slice of Your Bread"
 2452. "The Sprig of May"
 2453. "Navigation"
 2454. No record
 2455. "The Wearing of the Horns", "Horn Boys Horn"
 2456. "Old Woman of Rumford", "Artichokes and Cauliflowers"
 2457. "How Gallantly How Merrily", "The Shark"
 2458. "Mary Thompson"
 2459. "Molly Bawn"
 2460. "Fourteen Days in Georgia"
 2461. "Crows and Jackdaws"
 2462. "The Baker of Colebrook"
 2463. "He Was Under My Window"
 2464. "The Margaret and the Mary"
 2465. No record
 2466. No record
 2467. No record
 2468. "The Maid with the Long Birches"
 2469. "Sailor Song"
 2470. "Harry's Courtship"
 2471. "Harvest Song"
 2472. "Harvest Feast Song"
 2473. "Old Log Cabin Down the Lane"
 2474. "The Poor Orphan Boy"
 2475. "Johnny Smoker"
 2476. "As I Was in the Fields One Day"
 2477. No record
 2478. "The Drunkard's Farewell to His Folly"
 2479. "You Asked Me to Sing"
 2480. "Be Kind to Nainsel' John"
 2481. "Drumallachie"
 2482. "Horn Fair"
 2483. "Down in the Meadows"
 2484. "All Glory to God"
 2485. "Drumhullogan Bottoms"
 2486. "The Maid of Magheracloone"
 2487. No record
 2488. "The Tyrone Tailor"
 2489. "The Wonderful Musician"
 2490. "The Kinlough Cow"
 2491. "The Ella M. Rudolph"
 2492. "James Magee"
 2493. "The Maid of Culmore"
 2494. "Mullinabrone"
 2495. "The Banks of Kilrea"
 2496. "The Highland Soldier"
 2497. "Tammy Toddles"
 2498. "The Parson's Fat Wedder", "Parson Brown's Sheep"
 2499. "I Can't Get a Horse in the Country"
 2500. "Aikey Brae"

2501 to 2600 
 2501. "The Rozzin Box"
 2502. "William Scanlon"
 2503. "The Ballymount Forest"
 2504. "Donnybrook Fair"
 2505. "The Lament of a Traveller Woman"
 2506. "Big Jimmy Drummond"
 2507. "Doctor Pritchard"
 2508. "Gum Shellack"
 2509. "Poor Old Man"
 2510. "The Deserter from Kent"
 2511. "Allan MacLean"
 2512. "The Shady Green Tree"
 2513. "My Love Lays Cold Beneath My Feet"
 2514. "The Dying Ploughboy"
 2515. "The Jolly Barber"
 2516. "Feeing Time"
 2517. "The Feein' Time"
 2518. "McGinty's Meal and Ale"
 2519. "Fine Featherin Oot"
 2520. "Ten a Penny Walnuts"
 2521. "Barbara Bell"
 2522. "The Whorton Wedding"
 2523. "Canny Cummerlan"
 2524. "Gwordie Gill"
 2525. "Jenny's Complaint"
 2526. "Rob Lowrie"
 2527. No record
 2528. No record
 2529. "The Royal George"
 2530. "The Ranter Parson"
 2531. "Hunting Song"
 2532. "All Things Are Quite Silent"
 2533. "The Nobleman"
 2534. "Kissin' in the Dark"
 2535. "Kiss Me in the Dark"
 2536. "I Married a Wife"
 2537. "Moreton Bay"
 2538. "I Am A Pretty Wench"
 2539. "The Eighteenth June", "The Famous Battle of Waterloo"
 2540. "Fare Thee Well My Dearest Dear"
 2541. "The Long Whip"
 2542. "I Wouldn't Leave My Little Wooden Hut"
 2543. "Sledburn Fair"
 2544. "Valiant Monroe"
 2545. "Yubberdon Mawms"
 2546. "What Did Your Sailor Leave?"
 2547. "Boney's Lamentation"
 2548. No record
 2549. "The Moon Shines Bright"
 2550. "Mark Well My Words", "Mark Me Once More Then John"
 2551. "'Ware Out Mother"
 2552. "All The Little Chickens In The Garden"
 2553. "Shades of Evening"
 2554. "Highland Jane"
 2555. "Three Pretty Maidens"
 2556. "The Maid of Listole"
 2557. No record
 2558. "Pat Must Emigrate"
 2559. "A New Song on Lucky Elopement"
 2560. "Boughleen Down"
 2561. "Kate of Arglyn"
 2562. "Farewell to Tarwathie"
 2563. "The Fancy Frigate", "La Pique"
 2564. "Any Complaints"
 2565. "Hand Me Down My Petticoat"
 2566. No record
 2567. "Ghost Army of Korea"
 2568. "Seven Years in the Sand", "The Cocks is Crowing"
 2569. "On the Move"
 2570. "Ivor"
 2571. "Aiken Drum" (Hogg 89)
 2572. "Killicrankie"
 2573. "The Wee Wee German Lairdie"
 2574. "The Plaidy Awa'"
 2575. "The Maid Gaed tae the Mill", "The Miller and Lass"
 2576. "The Scoldin' Wife"
 2577. "Supper Isna Ready"
 2578. "Gala Water"
 2579. "Kissin's No Sin"
 2580. "Friendless Mary"
 2581. "Jenny Nettles"
 2582. "Lassie Wi' the Yellow Coatie"
 2583. "Eppie Morrie" (Child 223)
 2584. "Pitgair", "O Charlie O Charlie"
 2585. "The Jute Mill Song"
 2586. "Fourpence A Day"
 2587. "Johnny Lad"
 2588. No record
 2589. "The Big Mansion House"
 2590. "Wha's at the Window"
 2591. "Nice Young Maidens"
 2592. "John of Badenyon"
 2593. "When I Was Single"
 2594. "The Close of an Irish Day"
 2595. "Jenny Dang the Weaver"
 2596. "If I Had Gold in Gowpins"
 2597. "The Banks of Coquet"
 2598. "The Maid of Seventeen"
 2599. "My Bonny Miner Lad"
 2600. "Jenny Dang the Weaver"

2601 to 2700 
 2601. "My Sailor Laddie"
 2602. "As I Got Up One Morning"
 2603. "The Lady on the Mountain"
 2604. "Down by the River"
 2605. "Isabella"
 2606. "Three Sheep Skins"
 2607. "The Angler's Song in Praise of the Coquet"
 2608. "At Home Wad I Be"
 2609. "The Banks of Tyne"
 2610. No record
 2611. "Dol-li-a"
 2612. "The Mouse's Song"
 2613. "O How I Love Somebody"
 2614. "Rest Warrior Rest"
 2615. No record
 2616. "Derwentwater's Farewell"
 2617. "The Roses Blaw"
 2618. "The Singin' Hinnie"
 2619. "Blow the Wind Southerly"
 2620. "Skipper's Wedding"
 2621. "Shallow Brown"
 2622. No record
 2623. "The Blackball Line"
 2624. "Blow the Man Down"
 2625. "Hanging Johnny"
 2626. "Ranzo"
 2627. "Roll the Cotton Down"
 2628. "Sally Brown"
 2629. "We'll Pay Paddy Doyle"
 2630. "When I Was Bound Apprentice in Fair London City"
 2631. "The Queen's Health"
 2632. "The Benjamin's Lamentations"
 2633. No record
 2634. "Old Militia Song"
 2635. "Betty and Her Ducks"
 2636. "Flandyke Shore"
 2640. "The Crafty Farmer" (Child 283)
 2641. "Lucy's Flittin"
 2642. "The Adventures of Sandy and Donald to the Plains of Waterloo"
 2643. "Rob O' the Capper"
 2644. "Newcastle Lullaby"
 2645. "The Brisk Young Country Lady"
 2646. "Poacher's Song"
 2647. "Nature's Gay Day"
 2648. "Pretty Frances", "O When I Was a Maiden"
 2649. "The Wind", "I'll Tell Me Ma"
 2650. "Round and Round the Village"
 2651. "The Old Mare"
 2652. "Auld Robin Gray"
 2653. "Ben Bolt"
 2654. "The Bard of Armagh"
 2655. "Nightingale in the East"
 2656. "Gentle Annie"
 2657. "Go It Neddy"
 2658. "Gossipping Wife"
 2659. "Hard Times Come Again No More"
 2660. "Footprints in the Snow"
 2661. "Irish Emigrant"
 2662. "The Ivy Green"
 2663. "Joe in the Copper"
 2664. "Love Was Once a Little Boy"
 2665. "Blue Eyed Nelly"
 2666. "Old Dog Tray"
 2667. "The Old Dog Tray"
 2668. "Poor Dog Tray"
 2669. "Old Musketeer"
 2670. "Out in the Green Fields"
 2671. "Pitcher of Water"
 2672. "Poor Little Sweep"
 2673. "The Post Captain"
 2674. "Remember Love Remember"
 2675. "Robin's Petition"
 2676. "Sailor's Grave"
 2677. "The Scarlet Flower"
 2678. "And Has She Then Failed"
 2679. "Single Days of Old"
 2680. "Skipper And His Boy"
 2681. "Phoebe Morel"
 2682. "Smiling Tom"
 2683. "Tara's Old Hall"
 2684. "The Spanish Cavalier"
 2685. "Tom Moody"
 2686. "Up With the Lark in the Morning"
 2687. "Wandering Bard"
 2688. "When We Were Boys Together"
 2689. "Willie We Have Missed You"
 2690. "A Woman Never Knows When Her Day's Work's Done"
 2691. "Oh Won't You Tell Me Why Robin"
 2692. "The Gypsy's Warning"
 2693. "The Lovely Sweet Banks of the Bride"
 2694. "The Ship is Ready to Sail Away"
 2695. "Farewell to the Village"
 2696. "The Blackwater Side"
 2697. "Times Are Hard"
 2698. "The Pirate's Serenade"
 2699. "The Wounded Hussar"
 2700. "The Soldier's Return"

2701 to 2800 
 2701. No record
 2702. "Willie Wastle"
 2703. "Old Blind Horse"
 2704. "Six Sweethearts"
 2705. "Biddy Rooney"
 2706. "The Jealous Lover"
 2707. "When I Wake In the Morning"
 2708. No record
 2709. "The Swan"
 2710. "It's Let Go Your Bowline"
 2711. No record
 2712. "Drimendroo"
 2713. "Springhill Mine Disaster"
 2714. "The Swallow"
 2715. "Along the Shores of Boularderie"
 2716. "Trip to the North Pole", "Tom Cornealy"
 2717. "Cape Breton Murder"
 2718. "Eight Famous Fishermen"
 2719. "Newfoundland Sealing Song"
 2720. "Nova Scotia Sealing Song"
 2721. "The Miramichi Fire" (Laws G24)
 2722. "Cotton Wool Pie"
 2723. "Harbour Grace"
 2724. "The Halifax Explosion" (Laws G28)
 2725. "Lonely Belvedere"
 2726. "The Hills and Glens"
 2727. No record
 2728. "When I Go Up to Shinum Place"
 2729. "Indian Methodist Conversion", "The Indian Hymn"
 2730. "By Kells Waters"
 2731. "In Cupid's Court"
 2732. "When First to This Country"
 2733. "Down By the Seaside"
 2734. "Yougal Harbour"
 2735. "Captain With the Whiskers"
 2736. "Echo Mocks the Corncrake"
 2737. "The Galway Shawl"
 2738. "Whistling Thief"
 2739. "The Wee Article"
 2740. "The Flower of Gortade"
 2741. "Soldier's Farewell to Manchester"
 2742. "The Moorlough Shore"
 2743. "Craiganee"
 2744. "The Flower of Dunaff Hill"
 2745. "The Flower of Sweet Strabane"
 2746. "The Town of Antrim"
 2747. "The Shamrock Sod No More"
 2748. "Killy Wells"
 2749. No record
 2750. "Molly Agnew"
 2751. "A New Broom Sweeps Clean"
 2752. "As I Roved Out One Evening"
 2753. "Jimmy and Nancy", "Johnnie to Molly"
 2754. "Just As I Was Going Away"
 2755. "There Was a Wealthy Farmer"
 2756. No record
 2757. "It's Five Long Years", "The Inconstant Sailor and the Distracted Maiden"
 2758. "Sally to her Bedchamber"
 2759. "The Perjured Maid"
 2760. "Bob Vail Was a Butcher Boy"
 2761. "Doherty's Wake"
 2762. "The Peanut Stand"
 2763. No record
 2764. "Mick Magee"
 2765. "Pat and the Gauger"
 2766. "Song of All Nations"
 2767. "Cold Water Song"
 2768. "Rock-a-bye Baby"
 2769. "Murder Song"
 2770. "Peter Wheeler"
 2771. "Daniel O'Connel"
 2772. "Green Grow the Rashes O"
 2773. "Henry Stewart"
 2774. "I'll Not Marry At All"
 2775. "It Was at the Town of Caylen"
 2776. "I Will Sail the Salt Seas Over"
 2777. "The Red Mantle"
 2778. "Once I Had a Daughter"
 2779. No record
 2780. "My Youthful Days"
 2781. "Seven Years in Dublin"
 2782. "She Bargained With a Captain"
 2783. "The Jenny Saviour"
 2784. "New Ireland Song"
 2785. "Out to Dark Harbour"
 2786. No record
 2787. "Buren's Grove"
 2788. "Sweet Rose of Killarney"
 2789. "Erin A'Green"
 2790. "The Flower of Sweet Erin the Green"
 2791. "Betsey of Dundee"
 2792. "Robin-a-Thrush"
 2793. "Two Little Girls in Blue"
 2794. "Pat O'Donnell"
 2795. "The Old Elm Tree"
 2796. "Southern Cross"
 2797. "Driving the Saw-Logs on the Plover"
 2798. "I Had But Fifty Cents", "Eighteen Pence"
 2799. "The Drunkard's Horse"
 2800. "The Yellow Rose of Texas"

2801 to 2900 
 2801. "The Dying Sargent", "A British Soldier"
 2802. "Virginia's Bloody Soil"
 2803. "The Days of Forty Nine"
 2804. "Curly Head of Hair"
 2805. "Felix the Soldier"
 2806. "Joe Bowers"
 2807. "Get Up Jack"
 2808. "Behind these Stone Walls"
 2809. "Fisherman's Girl"
 2810. No record
 2811. "Sweet William of Plymouth"
 2812. "Beautiful Lady of Kent"
 2813. "The London Lawyer's Son"
 2814. "The Carrier Dove"
 2815. "The Flag of Liberty"
 2816. "Rose of Ardee"
 2817. "Old Grannau Weal"
 2818. "Eliza"
 2819. "Lily Dale"
 2820. "Sparking Saturday Night"
 2821. "I've Been Roaming"
 2822. No record
 2823. "Lady Washington"
 2824. "Old England Forty Years Ago"
 2825. "Wasp Stinging Frolic"
 2826. "Perry's Victory"
 2827. "Noble Lads of Canada"
 2828. "The Maid of Monterrey"
 2829. "Buena Vista"
 2830. "The Used-Up Miner"
 2831. "The Liberty Ball"
 2832. "A Song For the Campaign"
 2833. "The True American"
 2834. "The Empire Club"
 2835. "Wait for the Wagon"
 2836. "Nancy Till"
 2837. No record
 2838. "The Gospel Ship"
 2839. "Bright Canaan"
 2840. No record
 2841. "The Lone Pilgrim"
 2842. "Alknomook"
 2843. "The Indian Hunter"
 2844. "The Indian Student"
 2845. "The Banks of the Schuylkill"
 2846. "The Sweeper"
 2847. "The Temperance Ship"
 2848. "The Watcher"
 2849. "Roving Bachelor"
 2850. No record
 2851. "Old Enoch"
 2852. "The Gunner and the Boatswain"
 2853. "The Plains of Waterloo"
 2854. "Turn the Glasses Over"
 2855. "Come Come Pretty Maids"
 2856. "Half-Past Ten"
 2857. "The Forfar Soldier"
 2858. "Imph'm"
 2859. "The Laird O' Cockpen"
 2860. "Young Waters" (Child 94)
 2861. "The Battle of Harlaw" (Child 163)
 2862. "Flodden Field" (Child 168)
 2863. "The Raid of the Reswire"
 2864. "The Highland Balow", "Lady Bothwell's Lament"
 2865. "The Wee Wee Man" (Child 38)
 2866. "Gillicrankie"
 2867. "The Battle of Sherrifmuir"
 2868. "Andro and His Cutty Gun"
 2869. "Hicks' Farewell"
 2870. "Swinging in the Lane", "Rosie Nell"
 2871. "When the Roses Bloom Again"
 2872. "The Scranky Black Farmer"
 2873. "Lamachree and Magrum"
 2874. "Sandy and Nap"
 2875. "Sandy's Mill"
 2876. "The Rinaway Bride"
 2877. "The Fall of Napoleon"
 2878. "The Hunting of Ruberslaw"
 2879. "The Shepherd's Virtuous Daughter"
 2880. "Young John Hiland"
 2881. "Annie Moore"
 2882. "The Orangeman's Walk", "The Cavan Buck"
 2883. "The Hills of Greenmore", "The Granemore Hare"
 2884. "The Hills of Tandragee"
 2885. "The Hills of Tandragee"
 2886. "The Dream", "The Bureau"
 2887. "Ellen O'Connor"
 2888. "Wild Slieve Gallion Braes"
 2889. "Cromie's Orange Buck"
 2890. "Hiring Fair and Hamiltonsbawn", "The Fair of Ross"
 2891. "Poor Flora On the Banks of the Boyne"
 2892. "The Park in Portadown"
 2893. "The Magdalen Green"
 2894. "The Lass Amongst the Heather"
 2895. "St. Patrick's Day in the Morning"
 2896. "The Muttonburn Stream"
 2897. "Jaunting Car"
 2898. "Sale of a Wife"
 2899. "In Praise of John Magee"
 2900. "The Emigrant's Farewell"

2901 to 3000 
 2901. "Lovely Jane From Enniskea"
 2902. "Dick Mooney's Daughter"
 2903. "The Bonnie Wee Lassie Who Never Said No"
 2904. "Thousands are Sailing"
 2905. No record
 2906. "My Charming Edward Boyle"
 2907. "That Dang Boat that First Took Me Over"
 2908. "The Glasgow Barber"
 2909. "The Sinking of the Graf Spree"
 2910. "The Orange Maid of Sligo"
 2911. "The Shady Woods of Trough"
 2912. "The Shamrock Boys from Kill"
 2913. "Jackson and Jane"
 2914. "General Guinness"
 2915. "Ould Heelball You're Boozing Again"
 2916. "The Irish Jubilee"
 2917. "Laurell Hill"
 2918. "Mary of Kilmore"
 2919. "The Clones Murder", "Fee and Flannigan"
 2920. "The Lisburn Maid"
 2921. "Sargent Neill"
 2922. "The Follom Brown-red"
 2923. "The Molly Maguires"
 2924. "Paddy Shinihan's Cow"
 2925. "The Hills of Tyrone"
 2926. "Columbia the Free", "Land of my Birth"
 2927. "Lough Ooney"
 2928. "The Flower of Corby Mill"
 2929. "Johnny Harte"
 2930. "The Belfast Maid"
 2931. No record
 2932. "Hunting Song"
 2933. "The Pony Song"
 2934. "Apprentice Boy"
 2935. "The Murder of William Funston"
 2936. "The Country I Was Born In", "I Have Just Left Donegal"
 2937. "The Burning of Rosslea"
 2938. "The Ploughboy"
 2939. "Carrowclare"
 2940. "The Tossing of the Hay"
 2941. "The New-Mown Hay"
 2942. "The Daysman"
 2943. "David's Flowery Vale"
 2944. "The Bonny Moor Hen"
 2945. "The Blazing Star of Drung"
 2946. "My Singing Bird"
 2947. "I Long For To Get Married"
 2948. "The True Lovers' Discussion"
 2949. "The Seducer Outwitted"
 2950. "It's Just About Ten Years Ago"
 2951. "It Was In the Queen's County"
 2952. "The Trader"
 2953. "Come All You Rakish Fine Young Men"
 2954. "The Close of an Irish Day"
 2955. "Adam in Paradise"
 2956. "The Arranmore Disaster"
 2957. "Copper John"
 2958. "The Maid of Seventeen"
 2959. "The Mason's Word"
 2960. "Minnie Picken"
 2961. "Moville Along the Foyle"
 2962. "The New Tractor"
 2963. "The Parish of Dunboe"
 2964. "The Son of a Gambolier" (Charles Ives)
 2965. "The Shores of Benone"
 2966. "Todd's Sweet Rural Shade"
 2967. "Three Gipsies Riding"
 2968. "Coleraine Regatta"
 2969. "How Pat is Represented"
 2970. "My Son in Amerikay"
 2971. "Brannigan's Pup"
 2972. "Willie was as Fine a Sailor"
 2973. "The Gentle Boy"
 2974. "Alan Bain"
 2975. "Miner Hill"
 2976. "A Restless Night", "Missouri Song", "Durie Down"
 2977. "If You Want to Go a Courting"
 2978. No record
 2979. "My Little Rambling Rose"
 2980. "Lasca"
 2981. "My Mother Was a Lady"
 2982. "The Two Drummers", "Beaver River"
 2983. "'Tis Pretty to be in Ballenderry"
 2984. "Old Ardboe"
 2985. "The Twisting of the Rope"
 2986. "The Blighted Lover"
 2987. "The Rich Man's Daughter"
 2988. "Young Alvin"
 2989. "Up in London Fair"
 2990. "The Wedding at Baltray"
 2991. "The Maid of Ballymore"
 2992. "Bold Doherty"
 2993. "The Tinker and his Budget"
 2994. "The Wind That Shakes the Barley"
 2995. "Emigrant's Farewell to His Country"
 2996. "The Star of Donegal"
 2997. "Sweet County Wexford"
 2998. "The Grazier Tribe"
 2999. "The Bantry Girls' Lament For Johnny"
 3000. "The Streams of Bunclody"

3001 to 3100 
 3001. "Mary of Dunglow"
 3002. "Limerick is Beautiful"
 3003. "Orange Lily O"
 3004. "The Parting Glass"
 3005. "Nell Flaherty's Drake"
 3006. "The Night of Ragman's Ball"
 3007. "Maid that Sold the Barley"
 3008. "Henry Joy McCracken"
 3009. "The Flower of Magherally"
 3010. "Dunlavin Green"
 3011. "Lanigan's Ball"
 3012. "Rocky Road to Dublin" (D.K. Gavan)
 3013. "The Old Orange Flute"
 3014. "Kevin Barry"
 3015. "The Boys of Wexford"
 3016. "Sporting Youth"
 3017. "Dublin Jack of All Trades"
 3018. "The Limerick Rake"
 3019. "Eliza"
 3020. "Father Murphy", "The Wexford Heroes"
 3021. "Bold McDermott Roe"
 3022. "Bold Belfast Shoemaker"
 3023. "Suit of Green"
 3024. "The Rocks of Bawn"
 3025. "The Maid of Sweet Gortein"
 3026. "Stonehouse Bay", "The Wreck of the Mary Jane"
 3027. "The Black Horse"
 3028. "The Smashing of the Van"
 3029. "The Manchester Martyrs"
 3030. "The Piper's Tunes"
 3031. "The Sporting Races of Galaway"
 3032. "The Maid With the Bonny Brown Hair"
 3033. "A New Song on the Taxes"
 3034. "Granuaile"
 3035. "The Hackler from Groushall"
 3036. "The Bold Rake"
 3037. "The Bann Water Side"
 3038. "Lillibullero"
 3039. "The Sporting Old Grey Mare"
 3040. "Rossa's Farewell"
 3041. "A Ballad Of Master McGrath"
 3042. "Sorrowful Lament for Callaghan, Greally, and Mullen"
 3043. "Come Each Jolly Fellow", "The Farmer"
 3044. "I Thank You Ma'am Says Dan"
 3045. "Come to the Bower"
 3046. "Red Haired Man's Wife"
 3047. "John McGoldrick's Trial for the Quaker's Daughter"
 3048. "Lovely Kate of Liskelhaun"
 3049. "Bachelor's Walk"
 3050. "The Boys of Old Erin on the Green"
 3051. "What Would You Do"
 3052. "With Kitty I'll Go"
 3053. "The Little Pack of Tailors"
 3054. "Swalwell Hopping"
 3055. "The Northumberland Bagpipes"
 3056. No record
 3057. "The Bonnie Redesdale Lassie"
 3058. "Pitman's Courtship"
 3059. "The Keel Row"
 3060. "Canny Newcassel"
 3061. "Jemmy Joneson's Wherry"
 3062. "Sair Fyel'd Hinny"
 3063. "Pawkie Paiterson's Auld Grey Yaud", "Robin Spraggon's Old Grey Mare"
 3064. "Bonny at Morn"
 3065. "Elsie Marley"
 3066. "Bold Robert Emmet"
 3067. "Pat of Mullingar"
 3068. "Poor Old Granuaile"
 3069. "The Foot and Mouth Disease"
 3070. "The Sargent's Lamentation"
 3071. "Lamentations of Patrick Brady"
 3072. "Farewell to Lissycasey"
 3073. "Farewell to Milltown"
 3074. "An Cailin Deas"
 3075. "The Cottage With the Horseshoe O'er the Door"
 3076. "A Stor Mo Chroi"
 3077. "The Bobbed Hair"
 3078. "Paddy the Cockney and the Ass"
 3079. "Paddy's Panacea"
 3080. "The Beggarman of County Down"
 3081. "You Ribbonmen of Ireland"
 3082. No record
 3083. "I'm a Rambling Youth"
 3084. "Napoleon Bonaparte"
 3085. "The Weaver"
 3086. "As I Strayed Through Dublin City"
 3087. "The Orkney Style of Courtship"
 3088. "The Canny Shepherd Laddie of the Hills"
 3089. "The Gresford Disaster"
 3090. "Rhynie"
 3091. "The Ould Piper"
 3092. "Paddy West"
 3093. "The Quaker"
 3094. "The Campanero"
 3095. "The Boatie Rows"
 3096. No record
 3097. "The Boat that First Brought Me Over"
 3098. "The Recruiting Officer", "The Merry Volunteers"
 3099. "Prince Charlie Stuart"
 3100. "Lang Johnny More" (Child 251)

3101 to 3200 
 3101. "Rub-a-Dub-Dub"
 3102. "Camborne Hill"
 3103. "Black Is the Color (of My True Love's Hair)"
 3104. "The Seven Irishmen"
 3105. "O'Brien of Tippetary"
 3106. "The Rollicking Boys Around Tandaragee"
 3107. "Waterford Boys"
 3108. "Sheela Nee Eyre"
 3109. "Bloom of Erin"
 3110. "Bonny Tavern Green"
 3111. "Poor Little Joe"
 3112. "The Drunkard's Ragged Wean"
 3113. "The Drunkard's Doom"
 3114. "The Old Brown Coat"
 3115. No record
 3116. "The Letter Edged in Black"
 3117. "The Pardon of Sydna Allen"
 3118. No record
 3119. "Deep Blue Sea"
 3120. "I'm Satisfied"
 3121. "Howdy Bill"
 3122. "An' We're a Noddin'"
 3123. "The Monkey's Wedding"
 3124. "Boll Weevil" (Laws I17)
 3125. "Groundhog"
 3126. "Kentucky Moonshiner"
 3127. "Four Thousand Years Ago"
 3128. "William Cook"
 3129. "The Charlie Song"
 3130. "Fair Lady of the Plains"
 3131. "The Arkansas Song"
 3132. "The Allegheny"
 3133. "Battle of Pea Ridge"
 3134. "Good News From Home"
 3135. "Often Drunk and Seldom Sober"
 3136. "The Drummer and the Cook", "Walking Tub of Butter"
 3137. "Johnny I Hardly Knew Ye"
 3138. "Lord Ullin's Daughter"
 3140. "A Virgin Most Pure"
 3141. "Admiral Benbow"
 3142. "Spottee"
 3143. "The Tyne Exile's Lament"
 3144. "The Fiery Clock Fiece"
 3145. "Cappy the Pitman's Dog"
 3146. "Bob Cranky's 'Size Sunday"
 3147. "Captain Bover"
 3148. "Bob Cranky's Adieu"
 3149. "Aboot the Bush Willy"
 3150. "O the Bonny Fisher Lad"
 3151. "The Mode O' Wooing"
 3152. "The Shoemaker"
 3153. "The De'il Stick the Minister"
 3154. "The Snows They Melt the Soonest"
 3155. "Up the Raw"
 3156. "Sawnie Ogilvie's Duel With His Wife"
 3157. "Jack and Tom"
 3158. "Derwentwater"
 3159. "Ca' Hawkie Through the Water"
 3160. "The Auld Fisher's Farewell to Coquet"
 3161. "I Wish Your Mother Would Come"
 3162. "Go to Kye Wi' Me"
 3163. "Success Unto the Coal Trade"
 3164. "My Lord 'Size"
 3165. "Shew Me the Way to Wallington"
 3166. "Felton Lonnin / The Kye Have Come Hame"
 3167. "The Miller's Wife o' Blaydon"
 3168. "Mawe Canny Hinny"
 3169. "The Antigallican Privateer"
 3170. "The Sandgate Lassie's Lament"
 3171. No record
 3172. "The Pitman's Happy Times"
 3173. "All Together Like the Folks O' Shields"
 3174. "Here's the Tender Coming"
 3175. "The Battle of Boulogne"
 3176. "The Laidley Worm of Spindleston-Heugh"
 3177. "Maw Bonny Gyetside Lass"
 3178. "The Sandgate Lass on the Ropery Banks"
 3179. "Liberty for the Sailors"
 3180. "Newcassel is my Native Place"
 3181. "My Laddie Sits O'er Late Up"
 3182. "The Hexhamshire Lass"
 3183. "The Song of Upper Wharfedale"
 3184. "The White Rose in the Broom"
 3185. "How Grand and How Bright", "The Worchestershire Carol"
 3186. "The Whitsun Song"
 3187. "The Yeovil Murder"
 3188. "The Holly and the Ivy Girl"
 3189. "The Trimdon Grange Explosion"
 3190. "Peggy Rye"
 3191. "Jowl Jowl and Listen"
 3192. "The Woman of Leigh"
 3193. "Blackleg Miner"
 3194. "I Am An Old Miner"
 3195. "Queen of Hearts"
 3196. "Dorsetshire George"
 3197. "Goodbye Old Ship of Mine"
 3198. "The Barmaid"
 3199. "The Travelling Tinker"
 3200. "The Old Blind Mare"

3201 to 3300 

 3201. "Get a Little Table"
 3202. No record
 3203. "My Old Clothes Shop", "Ikey Moses"
 3204. "The Christmas Goose"
 3205. "As Shepherds Watched Their Fleecy Care"
 3206. "Hark How the Heav'nly Angels Sing"
 3207. "Three Brothers in Fair Warwickshire"
 3208. "The Hindhead Murder"
 3209. "Who Owns The Game"
 3210. "Saviour's Birth", "Hark Hark What News"
 3211. No record
 3212. "Allison Gross" (Child 35)
 3213. "Old Pike"
 3214. "Life's Like a Ship"
 3215. "The Burwash Carol"
 3216. "The Ditchling Carol"
 3217. "The West Wycombe Band"
 3218. "Drodlins"
 3219. "No More I'll Go to Sea"
 3220. "Lowlands Away"
 3221. "Doodle Let Me Go (Yellow Girls)"
 3222. "Bangidero"
 3223. "Cheery Men"
 3224. "The Young Little Lambs"
 3225. "Behold the Grace Appears", "Back Lane"
 3226. "Sentenced to Death", "Bonny Lassie's Answer", "Lay Him Away Ower the Hillside"
 3227. "The Schooner Annie" (Laws N28)
 3228. "The Schooner Huberry"
 3229. "The Wreck of Old Number Nine" (Laws G26)
 3230. "Blue-eyed Mary"
 3231. "Mary Machree"
 3232. "Thomas and Nancy" (Laws K15)
 3233. No record
 3234. "Sweet Betsy from Pike"
 3235. "Sioux Indians" (Laws B11)
 3236. "Plantonio" (Laws B12)
 3237. "Zebra Dun"
 3238. "Sandy Sam and Rusty Jigs" (Laws B17)
 3239. "Strawberry Roan" (Laws B18)
 3240. "The Mountain Meadows Massacre" (Laws B19)
 3241. No record
 3242. "Root Hog or Die" (Laws B21)
 3243. "Sweet Jane" (Laws B22)
 3244. "Cowboy Jack" (Laws B24)
 3245. "The Boys of Sanpete County" (Laws B26)
 3246. "The Tenderfoot" (Laws B27)
 3247. "The Ballad of Casey Jones" (Laws G1)
 3248. "Twenty-One Years", "The C & O Wreck" (Laws E16)
 3249. "Henry K. Sawyer" (Laws G5)
 3250. "The Avondale Mine Disaster" (Laws G7)
 3251. "Charley Hill's Old Slope" (Laws G8)
 3252. No record
 3253. No record
 3254. "The Johnstown Flood" (Laws G14)
 3255. "The Milwaukee Fire" (Laws G15)
 3256. "Hip Hip Mr. Carpenter"
 3257. "The Three Drowned Sisters" (Laws G23)
 3258. "The Two Orphans", "The Brooklyn Theatre Fire" (Laws G27)
 3259. No record
 3260. "The Sherman Cyclone" (Laws G31)
 3261. "The Miners' Fate" (Laws G10)
 3262. "John Hardy" (Laws I2)
 3263. "Penitentiary Bound", "Po' Boy" (Laws I4)
 3264. "Delia Holmes" (Laws I5)
 3265. "The Railman's Song", "Jessie at the Railway Bar" 
 3266. "Liverpool Dock"
 3267. "Botany Bay"
 3268. "Lily Lee"
 3269. "Coleen Bawn"
 3270. "Prince Charles He is King James' Son"
 3271. "Three Wise Old Men", "Three Wise Old Women" 
 3272. "Paddy Magee"
 3273. "The Fatal Wedding"
 3274. "Little Nell of Narragansett Bay"
 3275. "Those Tassels on the Boots"
 3276. "Darlin Ould Stick"
 3277. "The Wedding of Ballyporeen"
 3278. "The Wearing of the Green"
 3279. "The Wreck of the Atlantic"
 3280. No record
 3281. "Frank Fidd"
 3282. "Reuben Ranzo"
 3283. "Larry McGee"
 3284. "The Poor Hard Working Man", "The Daddy of them All"
 3285. "The Fenian Song"
 3286. "The Bear River Murder"
 3287. "The Girl that was Drowned at Onslow" (Laws dG42)
 3288. "The Wreck of the Glenaloon"
 3289. "Jolly Sailors Bold"
 3290. "Droylsden Wakes"
 3291. "The Whale-Catchers"
 3292. "The Wreck of the Gilderoy"
 3293. "The Battle of Otterburn" (Child 161)
 3294. "The Willow"
 3295. "The Scolding Wife"
 3296. "The Outlaw Murray" (Child 305)
 3297. "Adam Bell", "Clim of the Clough", "William of Cloudesly" (Child 116)
 3298. "Robin Hood and Allen A Dale" (Child 138)
 3299. "Robin Hood's Death" (Child 120)
 3300. "The Orderly Man"

3301 to 3400 
 3301. "Leesome Brand" (Child 15)
 3302. "The Old Grey Duck"
 3303. "Mother May I Go out to Swim", "The Alphabet Song"
 3304. "The Soldier on the Battlefield"
 3305. "Old Smuggler's Song"
 3306. "St. Genny's Fox-Hunting Song"
 3307. "Rouse Rouse"
 3308. "O What is that Upon Thy Head"
 3309. "Siege of St. Malo"
 3310. "Toby"
 3311. "An Evening So Clear"
 3312. "Carol for Twelfth Day"
 3313. "Goodbye Mike Goodbye Pat"
 3314. "The Robber's Retreat"
 3315. "Trelawny (The Song of the Western Men)" (Robert Stephen Hawker)
 3316. "Wheal Rodney"
 3317. "Miner's Song"
 3318. "William Coombe"
 3319. "Cornish Girls"
 3320. No record
 3321. "Young Banker", "Banking Boy"
 3322. "The Bent Sae Brown" (Child 71)
 3323. "Poor Shepherds"
 3324. "The Green Woods O' Airlie"
 3325. "Bleacher Lass o' Kelvinhaugh"
 3326. "Bonnie Lassie's Answer"
 3327. "Wreck of the Royal Charter"
 3328. "If There Be Danger"
 3329. "Lovely Jane"
 3330. "Bundle and Go"
 3331. "We Happy Herdsmen"
 3332. "The Son of God They Did Betray"
 3333. "Twelve Articles"
 3334. "The Irish Boy"
 3335. "Rose Red and the White Lily" (Child 103)
 3336. "Prince Heathen" (Child 104)
 3337. "Poor Old Maidens"
 3338. "Nelson's Last Victory"
 3339. "Poor Wayfaring Stranger"
 3340. "My Good Looking Man"
 3341. "The Connaught Man's Trip to Belfast"
 3342. "The Old Tobacco Box"
 3343. "Birnie Bouzle"
 3344. "Jockey to the Fair"
 3345. "The Miracle Flower"
 3346. "Go Tell Aunt Rhody"
 3347. No record
 3348. "Many Thousand Go"
 3349. "In That Morning"
 3350. "Jessie and Jimmie"
 3351. "Busk and Go Dearie Go", "Mary's Ass"
 3352. "The Death of Ben Hall"
 3353. No record
 3354. "Billy Brown"
 3355. "Muldoon the Solid Man"
 3356. "List Bonnie Laddie"
 3357. "Cuttie's Wedding"
 3358. "The Gallowa' Hills"
 3359. "Bonnie Lass Come O'er the Burn"
 3360. "Far Over the Forth"
 3361. "Eenst Upon a Time"
 3362. "Oh Jeannie My Dear"
 3363. "The Braes of Killiecrankie"
 3364. "Jamis Telfer of the Fair Dodhead" (Child 190)
 3365. "The Girls of Shamrock Shore"
 3366. "I've Been a Wild Boy"
 3367. "One and Twenty"
 3368. "A Little Cocksparrow"
 3369. "Poison Beer"
 3370. "Peter Paynter"
 3371. "The Costermonger's Song"
 3372. "Botany Bay"
 3373. "One Day as I Rambled Through Glasgow"
 3374. "The Pride of Cloonkeen"
 3375. "Peter Heaney"
 3376. "The Sea Captain"
 3377. "The Old Caravee"
 3378. "The Wee Weaver"
 3379. "Donall Og"
 3380. "The Reaping of the Rushes Green"
 3381. "One Morning in June"
 3382. "Drinking Strong Whiskey"
 3383. "Sweet Omagh Town"
 3384. "My Old Cottage Home"
 3385. "Little Chance", "How Tedious and Tasteless (the Hours)", "Edgefield", "Greenfields"
 3386. "The Old Churchyard"
 3387. "Roane County Prison Song"
 3388. "I'm a Stranger in this Country"
 3389. "The Heilanman's Ball"
 3390. "Johnny McIndoe"
 3391. "Robin Hood and the Beggar, I" (Child 133)
 3392. "Robin Hood and the Beggar, II" (Child 134)
 3393. "The Duke of Athole's Nurse" (Child 212)
 3394. "Brown Eyes"
 3395. "Brother Green"
 3396. "East Virginia"
 3397. "Kaiser and the Hindenberger"
 3398. "Young Lady in the Bloom of Youth"
 3399. "Lonely Tombs"
 3400. "I Saw a Light All in a Dream"

3401 to 3500 

 3401. "Bright and Shining City"
 3402. "Over in the Glory Land"
 3403. "Father Took a Light", "Mother's Got a Light and Gone to Heaven"
 3404. "Climbing Up Zion's Hill"
 3405. No record
 3406. "Lord I've Started for the Kingdom"
 3407. "I'm Alone in this World"
 3408. "No Hiding Place Down Here"
 3409. "Can the Circle Be Unbroken (By and By)"
 3410. "I Saw the Light"
 3411. No record
 3412. "Yankee Song"
 3413. "Cumberland Gap"
 3414. "Big Stone Gap"
 3415. "Back in the Hills"
 3416. "The Gambler" (Laws dE43)
 3417. "Icy Mountain"
 3418. "Short Life of Trouble"
 3419. "Chilly Winds"
 3420. "Greenback Dollar"
 3421. "In the Pines", "Where Did You Sleep Last Night"
 3422. "My Trunk is Packed"
 3423. "Reuben"
 3424. "Goodbye My Lover", "Cripple Creek"
 3425. "Old Bald Eagle"
 3426. "Black-Eyed Susie"
 3427. "The Blue-Eyed Gal"
 3428. "Georgia Buck"
 3429. "Ida Red"
 3430. "I'm A Longin' For to Go to This Road"
 3431. "Yonder Comes My Love"
 3432. "Sugar Hill"
 3433. "Skip to My Lou"
 3434. "Cripple Creek"
 3435. "Lulu", "Old Corn Whiskey"
 3436. "Old Coon Dog"
 3437. "Mule Skinner Blues"
 3438. "The Old Chisholm Trail"
 3439. "One Cold and Frosty Morning"
 3440. "Did You Ever See the Devil Uncle Joe"
 3441. "Johnny Booker"
 3442. "Ole Grey Mare"
 3443. "The Fox Chase"
 3444. "Goin Down Town", "Lynchburg Town"
 3445. "Forsaken Love"
 3446. "Weeping Sad and Lonely"
 3447. "The Plooman Laddie"
 3448. "The Plooman Laddies"
 3449. "When I Was Noo but Sweet Sixteen"
 3450. "Bonny Udny"
 3451. "The Jolly Sportsman"
 3452. No record
 3453. "Lace Maker's Song"
 3454. "A Poor Aviator Lay Dying"
 3455. "To Sheepshearing We Will Go"
 3456. "Ladies Won't You Marry"
 3457. "Down By the Dark Arches"
 3458. "Kissing"
 3459. "Hecketty Pecketty"
 3460. "The Drunken Man"
 3461. "Through Lonesome Woods"
 3462. "As I Was Walking Down Old Green Lane", "A Collier Lad"
 3463. "Cottage for Sale"
 3464. "Cock a doodle doo"
 3465. "Strike For Better Wages"
 3466. "Drinking"
 3467. "John Wesley"
 3468. No record
 3469. "Taunton Gaol"
 3470. "The Factory Doll"
 3471. "Calliforney"
 3472. "We Be"
 3473. "Banks of the Band"
 3474. "The Blackbird of Mullaghmore"
 3475. "Bonny Portmore"
 3476. "Lough Erin's Shore"
 3477. "The Maid of Ballydoo"
 3478. "The Purple Boy"
 3479. "The Deluded Lover", "As I Roved Out"
 3480. "The Waggoner"
 3481. "Adam Buckham"
 3482. "Hap an Row"
 3483. "Diddle Diddle, Or The Kind Country Lovers", "Lavender's Blue"
 3484. "The Banks of the Dee"
 3485. "Little Chance"
 3486. "Celebrated Working Man", "In The Bar-room", "Shovellin' Back the Slate"
 3487. "The Bonny Pitt Laddie"
 3488. "Byker Hill", "Walker Pits", "Walker Pit and Byker Shore"
 3489. "The Iron Man"
 3490. "Stanley Market"
 3491. "Poverty Knock"
 3492. "Macadam and Co."
 3493. "Greenhill Farm"
 3494. "The Knocking-Up Song"
 3495. "Twenty-Pound Dog"
 3496. "Three Jolly Fishermen"
 3497. "The Old Yow"
 3498. "The Shepherd and the Shepherdess"
 3499. "Macalpine's Navvy Gang"
 3500. "The Bold Miner"

3501 to 4000 
 3504. "Cushie Butterfield", "Lambton Worm" (See also Roud 2337)
 3507. "Geordy Black"
 3509. "The Donibristle Disaster"
 3510. "Miner's Lifeguard", "A Miner's Life"
 3511. "Blaydon Races"
 3550. "This Old Man"
 3574. "The Hare's Dream", "The Hare's Lament"
 3594. "Old Joe Clark"
 3597. "Love Has Gained the Day"
 3599. "Home on the Range"
 3604. "The Dreary Black Hills"
 3632. "Roll the Old Chariot"
 3634. "Rain and Snow"
 3674. "A Laundry Song"
 3715. "I'll Be All Smiles Tonight"
 3722. "The Whummil Bore" (Child 27)
 3723. "The Queen of Elfan's Nourice" (Child 40)
 3724. "The Dead Horse Shanty"
 3749. "I Had a Little Nut Tree"
 3753. "Three Blind Mice"
 3756. "The Arkansas Traveler"
 3767. "Puttin' On the Style"
 3778. "Bonny Woodhall"
 3800. "The Guise O Tough"
 3801. "Caledonia", "Jean and Caledonia"
 3812. "Flowers of the Forest"
 3819. "Down in My Sally's Garden"
 3846. "On the Banks of the Don"
 3855. "Clerk Saunders" (Child 69)
 3856. "Jock the Leg and the Merry Merchant" (Child 282)
 3867. "King Henry" (Child 32)
 3875. "Young Peggy" (Child 298)
 3876. "The Laird of Wairston" (Child 194)
 3878. "The Queen of Scotland" (Child 301)
 3879. "The Earl of Mar's Daughter" (Child 270)
 3880. "Earl Crawford" (Child 229)
 3881. "Charlie MacPherson" (Child 234)
 3882. "Brown Robyn's Confession" (Child 57)
 3883. "Child Owlet" (Child 291)
 3884. "Lady Isabel" (Child 261)
 3885. "Bonny Bee Hom" (Child 92)
 3886. "The Holy Nunnery" (Child 303)
 3887. "The New-Slain Knight" (Child 263)
 3888. "The White Fisher" (Child 264)
 3889. "The Knight's Ghost" (Child 265)
 3890. "Thomas o Yonderdale" (Child 253)
 3902. "The Clerk's Twa Sons O Owsenford" (Child 72)
 3904. "Blancheflour and Jollyflorice" (Child 300)
 3908. "Bonny John Seton" (Child 198)
 3909. "Lord Livingstone" (Child 262)
 3910. "Willie and the Earl Richard's Daughter" (Child 102)
 3911. "Young Benjie" (Child 86)
 3912. "Kemp Owyne" (Child 34)
 3914. "Young Ronald" (Child 304)
 3915. "Auld Matrons" (Child 249)
 3918. "James Grant" (Child 197)
 3925. "Walter Lesly" (Child 296)
 3928. "Dugall Quin" (Child 294)
 3931. "The Bonny Lass of Anglesey" (Child 220)
 3935. "Young Bearwell" (Child 302)
 3955. "Robin Hood and the Bishop" (Child 143)
 3956. "Robin Hood and the Newly Revived" (Child 128)
 3957. "Robin Hood Rescuing Will Stutly" (Child 141)
 3958. "The Noble Fisherman", "Robin Hood's Preferment" (Child 148)
 3959. "The West Country Damosel's Complaint" (Child 292)
 3960. "Sheath and Knife" (Child 16)
 3961. "The Boy and the Mantle" (Child 29)
 3962. "Burd Ellen and Young Tamlane" (Child 28)
 3963. "St. Stephen and Herod" (Child 22)
 3964. "Judas" (Child 23)
 3965. "King Arthur and King Cornwall" (Child 30)
 3966. "The Marriage of Sir Gawain" (Child 31)
 3967. "King Henry" (Child 32)
 3968. "The Laily Worm and the Machrel of the Sea" (Child 36)
 3969. "Sir Aldingar" (Child 59)
 3970. "King Estmere" (Child 60)
 3971. "Old Robin of Portingale" (Child 80)
 3972. "The Bonny Birdy" (Child 82)
 3973. "Will Stewart and John" (Child 107)
 3974. "Christopher White" (Child 108)
 3975. "Crow and Pie" (Child 111)
 3976. "Robyn and Gandeleyn" (Child 115)
 3977. "Robin Hood and Guy of Gisborne" (Child 118)
 3978. "Robin Hood and the Monk" (Child 119)
 3979. "Robin Hood and the Potter" (Child 121)
 3980. "Robin Hood and the Butcher" (Child 122)
 3981. "The Jolly Pinder of Wakefield" (Child 124)
 3982. "Robin Hood and the Tinker" (Child 127)
 3983. "Robin Hood and the Prince of Aragon" (Child 129)
 3984. "Robin Hood and the Scotchman" (Child 130)
 3985. "Robin Hood and the Shepherd" (Child 135)
 3986. "Robin Hood's Delight" (Child 136)
 3987. "Robin Hood and the Pedlars" (Child 137)
 3988. "Little John A Begging" (Child 142)
 3989. "Robin Hood's Chase" (Child 146)
 3990. "Robin Hood's Golden Prize" (Child 147)
 3991. "Robin Hood's Birth, Breeding, Valor and Marriage" (Child 149)
 3992. "Robin Hood and Maid Marian" (Child 150)
 3993. "The King's Disguise, and Friendship with Robin Hood" (Child 151)
 3994. "Robin Hood and the Golden Arrow" (Child 152)
 3995. "Robin Hood and the Valiant Knight" (Child 153)
 3996. "A True Tale of Robin Hood" (Child 154)
 3997. "Hugh Spencer's Feats in France" (Child 158)
 3998. "Durham Ford" (Child 159)
 3999. "The Knight of Liddesdale" (Child 160)
 4000. "Sir John Butler" (Child 165)

4001 to 4100 
 4001. "The Rose of England" (Child 166)
 4002. "Thomas Cromwell" (Child 171)
 4003. "Musselburgh Field" (Child 172)
 4004. "Earl Bothwell" (Child 174)
 4005. "The Rising of the North" (Child 175)
 4006. "Northumberland Betrayed By Douglas" (Child 176)
 4007. "The Earl of Westmoreland" (Child 177)
 4008. "Rookhope Ryde" (Child 179)
 4009. "King James and Brown" (Child 180)
 4010. "Willie MacIntosh" (Child 183)
 4011. "The Lads of Wamphray" (Child 184)
 4012. "Dick o the Cow" (Child 185)
 4013. "Kinmont Willie" (Child 186)
 4014. "Hobie Noble" (Child 189)
 4015. "Lord Maxwell's Last Goodnight" (Child 195)
 4016. "The Battle of Philiphaugh" (Child 202)
 4017. "The Baron of Brackley" (Child 203)
 4018. "Loudon Hill" (Child 205)
 4019. "The Lady of Arngosk" (Child 224)
 4020. "The Slaughter of the Laird of Mellerstain" (Child 230)
 4021. "The Coble o Cargill" (Child 242)
 4022. "James Hatley" (Child 244)
 4023. "Lady Elspat" (Child 247)
 4024. "Lord Thomas Stuart" (Child 259)
 4025. "Earl Rothes" (Child 297)
 4026. "Lovewell's Fight"
 4027. "Braddock's Defeat"
 4028. "On the Eighth Day of November"
 4029. "The Battle of Point Pleasant"
 4030. "The Battle of Bridgewater"
 4031. "The Sir Robert Peel"
 4032. "Battle of Prairie Grove"
 4033. "Andersonville Prison"
 4034. No record
 4035. "Mustang Gray"
 4036. "John Garner's Trail Herd"
 4037. "The Crooked Trail to Holbrook"
 4038. "George Britton"
 4039. "On the Trail to Idaho"
 4040. "When I Was a Brave Cowboy"
 4084. "Sally Greer", "Nellie Greer"

4101 to 4200 
 4101. "The Tennessee Killer" (Laws dE41)
 4102. "Talt Hall" (Laws dE42)
 4103. "The Dying Desperado" (Laws dE46)
 4104. "Bury Me Out on the Prairie", "I've Got No Use For Women" (Laws dE47)
 4105. "Harry Orchard"
 4106. "The Fate of Edward Hickman" (Laws dE49)
 4107. "The Old Rock Jail Behind the Iron Gate" (Laws dE50)
 4108. No record
 4109. No record
 4110. "The Murder of Colonel Sharp" (Laws dF38)
 4111. "Polly Williams" (Laws dF39)
 4112. "The Murder of Mrs. Broughton" (Laws dF30)
 4113. No record
 4114. "Gladys Kincaid" (Laws F41)
 4115. "The Janie Sharp Ballet" (Laws dF43)
 4116. "Maria Bewell" (Laws dF44)
 4117. "Nell Cropsey" (Laws dF45)
 4118. No record
 4119. "The Murder of Charley Stacey" (Laws dF47)
 4120. "William Baker" (Laws dF48)
 4121. No record
 4122. "John Ferguson" (Laws dF52)
 4123. "The Murder of Lottie Yates" (Laws dF53)
 4124. "Jesse Adams" (Laws dF54)
 4125. "Elk River Boys" (Laws dF55)
 4126. "The Murder of Marian Parker" (Laws dF56)
 4127. "Little Marion Parker" (Laws dF57)
 4128. "The Hennessy Murder" (Laws dF58)
 4129. "The Millman Song" (Laws dF60)
 4130. "Arch and Gordon" (Laws dF61)
 4131. "The Death of Samuel Adams" (Laws dF62)
 4132. No record
 4133. No record
 4134. "Martha Dexter" (Laws dG34)
 4135. No record
 4136. "The Hartford Wreck" (Laws dG36)
 4137. "The Brush Creek Wreck" (Laws dG37)
 4138. No record
 4139. "The Bicera" (Laws dG39)
 4140. "The Mines of Locust Dale" (Laws dG40)
 4141. "The Wreck on the Somerset Road" (Laws dG41)
 4142. "The Mcdonald Family" 
 4143. No record
 4144. "Lee Bible" (Laws dG46)
 4145. "West Palm Beach Storm" (Laws dG47)
 4146. "Aaron Hart" (Laws dG48)
 4147. "Only a Brakeman" (Laws dG49)
 4148. No record
 4149. "The Wreck of the Royal Palm" (Laws G51)
 4150. "The Wreck of the Shenandoah" (Laws dG52)
 4151. "Fire Tragedy" (Laws dG53)
 4152. No record
 4153. "Chankapin" (Laws dH33)
 4154. "The Bear Hunters of 1836" (Laws dH34)
 4155. "The Hog-Thorny Bear" (Laws dH35)
 4156. "Bill Hopkins' Colt" (Laws dH36)
 4157. "The Champion of Moose Hill" (Laws dH37)
 4158. "Jim Clancy" (Laws dH38)
 4159. No record
 4160. "Old Joe" (Laws dH41)
 4161. "I Was Sixteen Years of Age" (Laws dH42)
 4162. "The Iron Mountain Baby" (Laws dH43)
 4163. "As I Went Out For a Ramble" (Laws dH44)
 4164. "Young Billy Crane" (Laws dH46)
 4165. "Perigoo's House" (Laws dH48)
 4166. "The Messenger Song" (Laws dH49)
 4167. "Rufus's Mare" (Laws dH50)
 4168. "Laura Belle" (Laws dH53)
 4169. "Bugger Burns" (Laws dI21)
 4170. No record
 4171. No record
 4172. "De Titanic" (Laws dI26)
 4173. "God Moves on the Water" (Laws dI27)
 4174. "Miami Hairikin" (Laws dI28)
 4175. "Ella Speed" (Laws I6)
 4176. "Devil Winston" (Laws I7)
 4177. "Duncan and Brady"
 4178. "Batson" (Laws I10)
 4179. "Dupree" (Laws I11)
 4180. "Poor Lazarus" (Laws I12)
 4181. "Railroad Bill"
 4182. "Bully of the Town" (Laws I14)
 4183. "Stagger Lee"
 4184. "These Bones Going to Rise Again" (Laws I18)
 4185. "Staggerlee" (Laws I15)
 4186. No record
 4187. "Just a Wee Drop and Doris"
 4188. No record
 4189. "The Miners"
 4190. "Strike the Bell"
 4191. "John Adkins' Farewell" 
 4192. "Tom Dooley"
 4193. "I Have No Mother Now"
 4194. "I Used to Have a Father"
 4195. "No Change in Me"
 4196. "Come All Young Men"
 4197. "I Loved a Lass"
 4198. No record
 4199. No record
 4200. "Big Eyed Rabbit"

4201 to 4300 
 4204. "She'll Be Coming 'Round the Mountain"
 4209. "Shortnin' Bread"
 4211. "Bile Them Cabbage Down"
 4221. "Cod Liver Oil"
 4228. "Wabash Cannonball"
 4247. "Turkey in the Straw"
 4299. "Take This Hammer"

4301 to 4400 
 4301. "The Moonshiner"
 4321. "Abdul Abulbul Amir"
 4326. "My Grandfather's Clock" (Henry Clay Work)
 4343. "Shawneetown Flood"
 4379. "The Irish Rover"

4401 to 4500 
 4401. "Drill Ye Tarriers Drill"
 4427. "Feller from Fortune"
 4432. "I's the B'y", "I'se the B'y"
 4438. "Mary Ann"
 4439. "Baa, Baa, Black Sheep"
 4443. "Roll the Woodpile Down"
 4455. "Over There", "Over Here", "The Flapjacks Tree", "In Kansas", "The Praties They Grow Small"
 4456. "Shady Grove"
 4461. "Dunderbeck"

4501 to 4600 
 4501. "Yankee Doodle"
 4505. "Crows in the Garden"
 4533. "Ferryland Sealer"
 4540. "Donkey Riding"
 4541. "Jack Was Every Inch a Sailor"
 4542. "The Badger Drive"
 4546. "The Day Columbus Landed Here"
 4550. "Land of the Silver Birch"
 4556. "Uncle Sam's Farm"
 4581. "Three Craws"
 4584. "New Year's Eve Carol"
 4585. "Greenside Wakes Song"
 4593. "Bogieside", "Adieu to Bogieside"

4601 to 4700 
 4614. "Darkie Sunday School"
 4619. "Peg and Awl"
 4624. "Going Across the Mountain"
 4628. "Storms May Rule the Ocean"
 4636. "Railroad Corral" (John Mills Hanson)
 4660. "Footprints in the Snow"
 4690. "Baltimore", "Bound for Baltimore", "Up She Goes"
 4693. "John Cherokee"
 4695. "Paddy Doyle"
 4696. "John Come Tell Us As We Haul Away"

4701 to 4800 
 4704. "Barnacle Bill"
 4710. "Roll Alabama Roll"
 4746. "Old Settler's Song"
 4753. "Worried Man Blues"
 4758. "Down Down Down"
 4766. "Rolling Home"
 4769. "The Bonnie Blue Flag"
 4790. "Cocaine Bill", "Cocaine Bill and Morphine Sue"
 4796. "The Sash", "The Hat My Father Wore"
 4800. "The Blarney Stone"

4801 to 4900 
 4801. "Star of the County Down" (Cathal McGarvey)
 4816. "Willie Moore"
 4826. "There Was a Crooked Man"
 4827. "The Big Ship Sails"
 4828. "The Ball of Kirriemuir"
 4830. "Cosher Bailey"
 4833. "Johnston's Motor Car"
 4836. "Good Ship Venus"
 4837. "I Used to Work in Chicago"
 4841. "The Fireship", "Dark and Roving Eye"
 4845. "The Shearing's No' For You"

4901 to 5000 
 4933. "O Death", "Oh Death", "Conversation with Death"
 4957. "I Wish I Was a Mole In the Ground"
 4959. "Nine Hundred Miles"
 4996. "Jimmy Brown the Newsboy"
 4998. "The Vicar of Bray"

5001 to 5100 
 5007. "Yonder Comes a Young Man"
 5040. "Did You Ever See a Lassie?"
 5089. "What Wondrous Love Is This"

5101 to 5200 
 5122. "The Convict's Song"
 5138. "When I Was No but Sweet Sixteen"
 5152. "The Shepherd Lad O' Rhynie"
 5160. "My Last Farewell to Stirling"

5201 to 5300 
 5214. "Will There Be Any Travellers in Heaven"
 5234. "Banna Strand"
 5249. "Pop Goes the Weasel"
 5269. "The Nonsense Song", H Mi Rinkum
 5294. "The Devil and Baliff McGlynn"

5301 to 5400 
 5378. "The Volunteer Organist" (William B. Gray and George Spaulding)
 5386. "Banks of the Nile"
 5397. "The Reed Cutter's Daughter"

5401 to 5500 
 5404. "The Back O' Bennachie"
 5407. "Cuckoo's Nest" (See also Roud 1506)
 5430. "Amazing Grace"
 5435. "Swing Low, Sweet Chariot"
 5439. "Wade in the Water"
 5470. "The Frozen Logger" (James Stevens)
 5473. "The Drover's Dream"
 5475. "Ye Sons of Australia"
 5477. "Little Fishes"
 5478. "Jim Jones at Botany Bay"

5501 to 5600 
 5512. "Comin' Thro' the Rye"
 5516. "Such a Parcel of Rogues in a Nation" (Hogg 36)
 5517. "Ye Jacobites by Name" (Hogg 34) (see also Roud V31021)
 5568. "The Monymusk Lads"

5601 to 5700 
 5680. "Join the British Army", "The Lass of Killiecrankie"
 5681. "The Kildare Rake"
 5684. "The Irish Boy", "Bonny Irish Boy" (distinct from Roud 565)

5701 to 5800 
 5701. "I Know Where I'm Going"
 5723. "Darlin' Cory"
 5731. "Sugar Baby"

5801 to 5900 
 5869. "Jock Hamilton", "Duke Hamilton", "Lord Hamilton"

 5878. “My Heart is in the Highlands”

5901 to 6000 
 5901. "Darrahill"

6001 to 7000 
 6287. "Kate Dalrymple"
 6294. "Auld Lang Syne"
 6306. "The Farmer in the Dell"
 6308. "(Here We Go Gathering) Nuts in May"
 6319. "Blackwaterside", "Bonny Irish Maid", "Lovely Irish Maid", "Irish Maid"
 6329. "The Blarney Roses"
 6363. "Handsome John"
 6364. "Midnight Special"
 6393. "The House of the Rising Sun"
 6423. "Old-Time Religion"
 6475. "Last Valentine's Day", "Black Sloven"
 6486. "Pat-a-cake,_pat-a-cake,_baker's_man"
 6487. "Little Bo Peep"
 6489. "Hickory Dickory Dock"
 6547. "'Til Next Market Day"
 6555. "Ballad of the Erie Canal"
 6562. "Annan Water" (Child 215 App.)
 6599. "The Ee-rye-ee Canal"
 6574. "The False Hearted Lover"
 6673. "When Johnny Comes Marching Home"
 6678. "Idumea"
 6695. "The Colorado Trail"
 6696. "Big Rock Candy Mountain"
 6701. "John the Revelator"
 6702. "This Train"
 6711. "Long John"
 6739. "The George Aloe and the Sweepstake" (Child 285)
 6740. "Young Andrew" (Child 48)
 6858. "Fitba' Crazy", "Football Crazy" (James Curran)
 6897. "I Am a Youth"
 6936. "Now Westlin Winds" (Robert Burns)
 6955. "Will My Soul Pass Through Ireland"
 6960. "Three Wee Glasgow Molls"

7001 to 8000 
 7046. "Danville Girl"
 7052. "Charming Betsy"
 7148. "Hey How My Johnny Lad"
 7382. "See That My Grave Is Kept Clean"
 7480. "Columbus Stockade Blues"
 7501. "He's Got the Whole World in His Hands"
 7622. "Mary Had a Little Lamb"
 7657. "It Ain't Gonna Rain No Mo'" (Wendell Hall)
 7666. "Twinkle, Twinkle Little Star"
 7686. "My Home's Across the Blue Ridge Mountains"
 7689. "Sitting on Top of the World"
 7734. "A Wise Old Owl"
 7841. "When This Old Hat Was New"
 7899. "Polly Put the Kettle On"
 7922. "The Muffin Man"
 7925. "Ring a Ring O'Roses"
 7989. "Harp Without a Crown", "The Girls of Dublin Town", "The Gals o' Dublin Town"
 7992. "Hallelujah, I'm a Bum"

8001 to 9000 
 8125. "Welcoming Poor Paddy Home"
 8136. "Ned of the Hill" (English version of Éamonn an Chnoic) (See also Roud V28517)
 8147. "The Cow Ate the Piper"
 8148. "How Many Miles to Babylon?"
 8179. "Annie Laurie"
 8187. "The Braes o' Killiecrankie"
 8194. "Lyke-Wake Dirge"
 8215. "The Old Turf Fire", "My Little Marble Hall"
 8231. "Dixie"
 8234. "All For Me Grog", "Across the Western Ocean"
 8240. "Pit Lie Idle"
 8247. "Hi, canny man" (Harry Nelson)
 8249. "Pit Lie Idle"
 8276. "False, False"
 8287. "Bully in the Alley"
 8293. "Sebastapol"
 8312. "Farewell to Cotia"
 8337. "Hark! The Herald Angels Sing"
 8358. "Angels from the Realms of Glory"
 8368. "Lydia Pinkham", "The Ballad of Lydia Pinkham", "Lily the Pink"
 8388. "The Bastard King of England"
 8399. "The Castlereagh River"
 8402. "Bless 'Em All" (words: Fred Godfrey, music: Robert Kewley)
 8460. "Over the Hills and Far Away"
 8503. "The Country Wedding"
 8513. "Bonnie Dundee" (Walter Scott)
 8694. "Come Under My Plaidie"

9001 to 10,000

 9134. "I Shall Not Be Moved"
 9139. "Copshawholme Fair"
 9164. "We're All Surrounded"
 9176. "Blackberry Grove"
 9212. "Black, White, Yellow and Green", "There Was an Old Woman"
 9234. "Cob Coaling" Song
 9266. "Down by the Glenside", "The Bold Fenian Men"
 9305. "Galtee Farmer"
 9375. "I Knew An Old Woman Who Swallowed a Spider"
 9397. "How Stands the Glass Around"
 9424. "The Red Light Saloon"
 9435. "Leaving of Liverpool"
 9439. "Johnny Come Down the Backstay"
 9520. "The Jacket Green" (Michael Scanlan)
 9534. "The Shaver"
 9536. "Waltzing Matilda" (Banjo Paterson)
 9595. "On the Banks of the Wabash, Far Away"
 9598. "The Bonnie Banks o' Loch Lomond"
 9601. "Old Black Joe", "Poor Old Joe" (Stephen Foster)
 9611. "Clementine"
 9612. "The Preacher and the Slave"
 9614. "Oh! Susanna" (Stephen Foster)
 9618. "Hanging on the Old Barbed Wire"
 9621. "She Was Poor but She Was Honest"
 9634. "The Rising of the Moon"
 9695. "On the Banks of the Wabash, Far Away", "The Lonely Woods of Upton"
 9701. "Oh My Monkey Jacket"
 9741. "The Three O'Donnells"
 9742. "The Three Flowers"
 9753. "Mursheen Durkin"
 9833. "The Great American Bum"
 9859. "The Runaway Train"
 9949. "The Moonshine Can"

10,001 to 11,000 
 10017. "I'm Alabama Bound"
 10030. "Corrine, Corrina", "Alberta"
 10052. "Rock About My Saro Jane"
 10055. "Shorty George"
 10056. "See See Rider"
 10057. "Dink's Song"
 10059. "Buckeye Jim"
 10061. "Pick a Bale of Cotton"
 10062. "Take a Whiff On Me"
 10072. "Sometimes I Feel Like a Motherless Child"
 10074. "Joshua Fit the Battle of Jericho"
 10075. "Gospel Plow"
 10082. "Keep On the Sunny Side"
 10124. "Eskimo Nell"
 10232. "My Father's a Lavatory Cleaner"/"Shine Your Buttons with Brasso"
 10259. "Do Your Balls Hang Low?"
 10263. "I Don't Want to Join the Army"
 10266. "Jack and Jill"
 10338. "Pump Away"
 10391. "They're moving Father's grave to build a sewer"
 10433. "Keep Your Lamp Trimmed and Burning"
 10447. "The Wee Wee Song"
 10465. "The Chinese Bum-boat Man"
 10477. "Empty Bed Blues"
 10493. "Hitler Has Only Got One Ball"
 10499. "D-Day Dodgers"
 10508. "Quartermaster's Stores"
 10513. "Salonika"
 10516. "The Kriegie Ballad"
 10517. "The Valley of Jarama" (See also Roud 24111)
 10523. "Far Far From Ypres", "Mop It Down", "Here's to the Good Old Whisky/Beer", "Drink It Down"
 10529. "When This Bloody War Is Over", "When This Lousy War Is Over"
 10531. "Glorious", "Drunk Last Night"
 10612. "Henry Joy"
 10678. "The Lord Bless Charlie Mott", "God Bless Charlie Mopps", "Charlie Mopps (the Man Who Invented Beer)"
 10682. "My Brother Sylvest"
 10733. "The Old Game Cock", "Every Morning"
 10764. "The Mountains Of Mourne" (Percy French)

11,001 to 12,000 
 11235. "It's a Long Way to Tipperary"
 11254. "I'm Bound Away"
 11257. "The Intoxicated Rat"
 11284. "One, Two, Buckle My Shoe"
 11504. "Pretty Boy Floyd"
 11520. "Lost John"
 11543. "Otto Wood the Bandit"
 11586. "Itsy Bitsy Spider"
 11594. "The Little Black Train Is Coming"
 11616. "Scraping Up Sand in the Bottom of the Sea"
 11659. "Ain't It a Shame"
 11661. "Salty Dog"
 11667. "Backwater Blues"
 11668. "Black Betty"
 11681. "Goodnight, Irene"
 11684. "Grey Goose"
 11687. "Good Morning Blues"
 11694. "Meeting at the Building"
 11730. "The Prisoner's Song"
 11733. "Hand Me Down My Walking Cane"
 11735. "Foggy Mountain Top"
 11765. "Hesitation Blues"
 11768. "Camptown Races"
 11771. "The Traveling Coon", "Traveling Man"
 11823. "Mary Don't You Weep"
 11861. "Jehovah, Hallelujah"
 11886. "Down by the Riverside", "Ain't Gonna Study War No More"
 11924. "Come By Here", "Kum-by-yah"
 11971. "Do Lord Remember Me"
 11975. "Michael Row the Boat Ashore"

12,001 to 13,000 
 12149. "Ragged but Right"
 12153. "Jordan Is a Hard Road to Travel"
 12463. "The Murder of Mary Tuplin"
 12172. "The Old Ship of Zion"
 12497. "The Hayseed"
 12551. "The Devil and the Feathery Wife"
 12598. "The Monkeys Have No Tails in Zamboanga"
 12657. "Blackbirds and Thrushes"
 12675. "The Saucy Arethusa", "The Arethusa"
 12682. "Early One Morning"
 12708. "The Rambling Gambler"
 12764. "Nobody Likes Me", "Guess I'll Eat Some Worms"
 12817. "Christmas is Coming"
 12783. "Carnival of Venice"
 12946. "My Love Is Like a Red Red Rose"
 12983. "Rub-a-dub-dub"

13,001 to 14,000 
 13026. "Humpty Dumpty"
 13027. "Little Jack Horner"
 13028. "See Saw Margery Daw"
 13029. "Hot Cross Buns"
 13153. "Diamonds In The Rough"
 13188. "A-Tisket, A-Tasket"
 13190. "Oranges and Lemons"
 13191. "Sing a Song of Sixpence"
 13204. "Green Peas Mutton Pies"
 13252. "The Rosabella"
 13268. "Eight Bells"
 13392. "The Harp that Once Through Tara's Halls" (Thomas Moore)
 13497. "Peter Peter Pumpkin Eater"
 13512. "Ten Little Indians"
 13530. "One, Two, Three, Four, Five"
 13642. "The Shoals of Herring" (Ewan MacColl)
 13711. "Wee Willie Winkie"
 13743. "The Road by the River" (Frank O'Donovan)
 13849. "Bluebells of Scotland"
 13867. "The Minstrel Boy" (Thomas Moore)
 13880. "Old Folks At Home" (Swannee River)
 13889. "The Banks O' Doon"
 13902. "Jack Be Nimble"
 13926. "Hard Travelin'"
 13943. "Hook and Line"
 13968. "Babylon is Fallen"
 13983. "When the Saints Go Marching In"

14,001 to 15,000 
 14001. "Alec's Lament"
 14002. "Bachelor's Hall"
 14003. "Mick Riley"
 14004. No record
 14005. "There's Nothing to Be Gained by Roving"
 14006. "If I Had As Many Wives"
 14007. "Baby's Ball"
 14008. "Three Little Mice"
 14009. "Eh Lor! Miss Molly"
 14010. "We're Marching Round and Round Singing Game"
 14011. "The Tramp"
 14012. "The Fatal Run"
 14013. "New Market Wreck"
 14014. "The Wreck of the Norfolk and Western Cannon Ball"
 14015. "Ben Dewberry's Final Run"
 14016. "The Wreck of No.52"
 14017. "The Wreck of the Sportsman"
 14018. "The Dying Engineer"
 14019. "The Wreck of the Virginian"
 14020. "The Wreck of the Virginian No.3"

15,001 to 16,000 
 15144. "Hello Stranger"
 15158. "Solidarity Forever"
 15159. "Which Side Are You On?"
 15161. "So Long, It's Been Good to Know Yuh" (Woody Guthrie)
 15162. "Sixteen Tons" (Merle Travis)
 15176. "If It Wasn't for Dicky" (Lead Belly)
 15211. "Rock Island Line"
 15220. "Go Tell It On the Mountain"
 15472. "Do Your Ears Hang Low?"
 15530. "The Lady and the Swine"
 15534. "The Factory Girl" (c.f. 1569)
 15532. "Follow the Drinkin' Gourd"
 15581. "Benny Havens oh" (See also Roud V8648)
 15600. "When First to This Country a Stranger I Came"
 15632. "Sleep On Beloved"
 15634. "The John B. Sails"
 15712. "My Body Has Tuberculosis"
 15724. "Watermelon"
 15989. "Talking Blues"

16,001 to 17,000 
 16143. "The Free Train"
 16151. "In Dem Long Hot Summer Days", "Old Riley"
 16339. "Star light, star bright"
 16378. "This Land Is Your Land"
 16397. "Linstead Market"
 16412. "Lost Johnny"
 16577. "The Tailor and the Mouse"
 16629. "Hobo's Lullaby"
 16636. "Lamorna"
 16718. "Sullivan's John"
 16813. "When I First Came To This Land"
 16814. "It's Raining, It's Pouring", "It's Raining"
 16821. "Poor Man's Heaven" (Carson Robison)
 16874. "Swell My Net Full"
 16898. "While Shepherds Watched Their Flocks"
 16907. "After Aughrim's Great Disaster", "Seán Ó Duibhir A' Ghleanna"
 16916. "Remember, Remember the Fifth of November"
 16932. "Molly Malone"
 16945. "The Cotton Mill Song"
 16962. "Kiss Me Goodnight, Sergeant Major"

17,001 to 18,000 
 17004. "Mop It Down", "Drink Her Down", "Here's to the Good Old Beer"
 17709. "Awake Arise Good Christians"
 17043. "Fraulein"
 17141. "Let Union Be In All Our Hearts"
 17321. "No Depression in Heaven"
 17329. "Sweet Heaven in My View"
 17558. "Cocaine", "Simply Wild About My Good Cocaine"
 17575. "The Old Cabin Home"
 17624. "The Sinking of the Reuben James"
 17635. "Sail Away Ladies"
 17648. "The Gypsy Countess"
 17672. "Delia's Gone", "Delia"
 17692. "Fishing Blues"
 17701. "Poor Boy Blues", "Poor Boy, Long Ways From Home"
 17768. "This Little Light of Mine"
 17770. "Cock a doodle doo"
 17771. "The Weaver and the Factory Maid"
 17774. "The Music Man"
 17840. "When Wilt Thou Save the People" (Ebenezer Elliott)

18,001 to 19,000 
 18130. "You Are My Sunshine" (Jimmie Davis, Charles Mitchell)
 18160. "Riley Riley"
 18229. "The Mountains of Mourne"
 18257. "Does the Spearmint Lose Its Flavor on the Bedpost Overnight"
 18267. "Eeny, meeny, miny, moe"
 18278. "Rise Up Shepherds and Follow"
 18341. "Angelina Baker"
 18411. "Nine Times a Night"
 18510. "Long Black Veil" (Danny Dill, Marijohn Wilkin)
 18521. "Nobody Knows You When You're Down and Out" (Jimmy Cox)
 18556. "Brown's Ferry Blues"
 18564. "Two Little Boys" (Theodore F. Morse, Edward Madden)
 18669. "Good Old Mountain Dew"
 18815. "London Lights"
 18829. "Must I Be Bound?"
 18830. "Beam of Oak"
 18834. "There Is a Tavern in the Town"
 18836. "The Dogger Bank"
 18867. "How Can a Poor Man Stand Such Times and Live?"
 18905. "Outward and Homeward Bound"
 18956. "Goodbye, Dolly Gray"

19,001 to 20,000 
 19019. "Coulters Candy" (Robert Coltart)
 19028. "Lulle Lullay", "The Coventry Carol"
 19096. "Rain Rain Go Away"
 19103. "The Man of Double Deed"
 19109. "The Wren Song"
 19132. "There was an Old Woman Who Lived in a Shoe"
 19234. "Postman Postman"
 19235. "Round and round the garden"
 19236. "Row, Row, Row Your Boat"
 19237. "Taffy was a Welshman"
 19297. "This Little Piggy"
 19299. "Solomon Grundy"
 19334. "Old Mother Hubbard"
 19478. "Hey Diddle Diddle"
 19479. "Jack Sprat"
 19526. "Monday's Child"
 19532. "Georgie Porgie"
 19536. "Lucy Locket"
 19557. "Leaning on the Lamb"
 19621. "Tom, Tom, the Piper's Son"
 19626. "Mary, Mary, Quite Contrary"
 19631. "Pease Porridge Hot"
 19639. "Ride a cock horse to Banbury Cross"
 19689. "Hark, Hark! The Dogs Do Bark"
 19695. "Three wise men of Gotham"
 19712. "Doctor Foster"
 19745. "Peter Piper"
 19772. "As I was going to St Ives"
 19777. "Simple Simon"
 19798. "Roses Are Red"
 19800. "Tweedledum and Tweedledee"
 19808. "On Ilkla Moor Baht 'at"

20,001 and above 
 20004. "If wishes were horses, beggars would ride"
 20096. "One for Sorrow"
 20105. "Bell Bottom Trousers"
 20174. "In Marble Halls", "In Marble Walls"
 20420. "You Might Easy Know a Doffer"
 20605. "Little Miss Muffet"
 20612. "Little Robin Redbreast"
 20764. "Streets of Forbes"
 20854. "This Is the House That Jack Built"
 20960. "San Francisco Bay Blues"
 21098. "The Rout of the Blues"
 21100. "The Sailor's Alphabet"
 21113. "The Ryans and the Pittmans", "We'll Rant and We'll Roar"
 21256. "Ben Backstay"
 21397. "The Man in the Moon"
 21449. "Pay Me My Money Down"
 21715. "Whiskey you're the Devil"
 21859. "Darby Kelly" (John Whitaker, Thomas Dibdin)
 21931. "Tomorrow Shall Be My Dancing Day"
 22062. "Spancil Hill" (Michael Considine)
 22229. "Boar's Head Carol"
 22317. "Shine On, Harvest Moon"
 22417. "The Old Rugged Cross" (George Bennard)
 22518. "All Around My Hat" (see also Roud 567)
 22568. "The Night Visiting Song", "The Cocks Are Crowing", "Adieu Unto All True Lovers"
 22620. "Awake Awake (You/Ye) Drowsy Sleeper(s)", "Arise Arise", "Cruel Father", "The Drowsy Sleeper", "Who Comes Tapping to My Window", "The Maiden's Complaint", "I'll Lock You Up in Your Bedchamber", "Who's There Who's There Under My Window", "Awake Awake Ye Drowsy Souls", "O Who is that that Raps (At My Window)", "Lovely Molly", "Single I'll Go to My Grave", "Let the Hills and Valleys Be Covered With Snow" (Laws M4) (English versions – see Roud 22621 for American versions)
 22621. "(The) Silver Dagger" (Laws G21), "(The/O/You) Drows(e)y Sleeper(s)", "Willie and Mary", "(Kattie/Katie/Katy) Dear", "(Oh/O) Molly (Dear) (Go Ask Your Mother)", "Awake Arise (You Drowsy Sleeper)", "Who's that Knocking (At My Window)", "Awake (O) Awake", "Wake Up (You Drowsy Sleeper)", "(Who Is That Under My) Bedroom Window", "Love Will Find a Way", "Raft-man's Song", "Death of William and Nancy", "Georgy Boy", "An Ardent Lover", "(The) Shining Dagger", "Arise Arise", "Maggie and Willie", "Who Taps At My Bedroom Window", "Wake Oh Wake You Drowsy Sleeper", "Charlie and Bessie", "Sleepy Desert", "Little Willie", "Sluggard Lover", "Willie Darling", "Awake Awake My Old True Lover", "The Droopery Sleeper", "Who is At My Window Weeping", "Annie Girl", "Hark Hark Who's At My Window", "The Broken Token" (American versions – see Roud 22620 for English versions)
 22827. "Cawsand Bay"
 22834. "Because He Was a Bonny Lad"
 22910. "Down in those Valleys"
 23107. "I Should Very Much Like to Know"
 23373. "Leaky Ship"
 23553. "Down at the Old Bull and Bush"
 23565. "Danny Boy" (Frederic Weatherly)
 23582. "The Dying Rebel"
 23614. "Blackbird's Nest"
 23650. "Streets of Laredo" (Laws B1)
 23663. "Angels We Have Heard on High"
 23978. "Ladies Auxiliary" (Woody Guthrie)
 24111. "Jarama Valley" (see also Roud 10517)
 24351. "The Bonny Cuckoo"
 24754. "Good King Wenceslas"
 24791. "The Lark in the Clear Air" (Samuel Ferguson)
 24820. "The Ryebuck Shearer"
 24978. "The Woad Song" (William Hope-Jones)
 24991. "Mary Went to a Tea Party"
 24996. "King Caractacus"
 25304. "Away in a Manger"
 25389. "All Things Bright and Beautiful" (Cecil Frances Alexander)
 25608. "What Child Is This?"
 25792. "Far Away in Australia"
 25903. "The Harvest Moon is Shining"
 26301. "Deck the Halls" (Thomas Oliphant)
 26713. "The Little Drummer Boy", "The Carol of the Drum" (Katherine Kennicott Davis)
 26736. "Lord of the Dance" (Sydney Carter)
 26771. "The Manchester Rambler" (Ewan MacColl)
 28881. "Nearer, My God, to Thee" (Sarah Flower Adams)
 29549. "The Humour Is On Me Now"
 29877. "Sailor's Prayer"
 30935. "The Owl and the Pussy-Cat"

"V" prefix 

 V2816. "The Long Lost Child", "Lament for the Long Lost Child"
 V4266. "The Vicar of Bray"
 V4761. "Hope The Hermit"
 V5007. "Cheer! Boys, Cheer! For the Fall of Sebastopol"
 V7466. "Seán Ó Duibhir a’ Ghleanna", "John O'Dwyer of the Glen"
 V8648. "Benny Havens Oh" (see also Roud 15581)
 V11404. "The Dolefull Dance and Song of Death", "Shaking of the Sheets"
 V11915. "Maid of LLanwellyn"
 V11958. "I Belong to Glasgow" (Will Fyffe)
 V13849. "Kelly The Boy From Killane" (Patrick Joseph McCall)
 V15486. "Pomona"
 V16366. "Tom Of Bedlam"
 V18439. "Guy Fawkes"
 V20125. "Battle of New Orleans"
 V23285. "Don't Forget Your Old Shipmate"
 V25265. "The Land Song"
 V28517. "Ned of the Hill" (English version of Éamonn an Chnoic) (See also Roud 8136)
 V28639. "Down by the Sally Gardens" (W. B. Yeats, believed to have been inspired by Roud 386)
 V31021. "Ye Jacobites by Name" (Robert Burns) (See also Roud 5517)
 V31022. "Such a Parcel of Rogues in a Nation" (Robert Burns)
 V33250. "The Yorkshire Irishman"
 V34542. "I Can't Find Brummagem"
 V35719. "If It Wasn't For the 'Ouses in Between"
 V38186. "Drowned Lovers" (see also Roud 91)
 V39245. "My Love's in Germany"
 V45381. "The Red Flag"

See also
 List of the Child Ballads
 List of Irish ballads
 Roud Folk Song Index ("Roud numbers")
 Child Ballads ("Child numbers")
 George Malcolm Laws ("Laws numbers")

References

External links
 Vaughan Williams Memorial Library Roud Index online searchable database
 mainlynorfolk.info/folk/songs/index.html Extensive list of over 2,000 folk songs with Child, Laws and Roud Index cross-references.

Folk songs by Roud number, List of